= Robbie Williams videography =

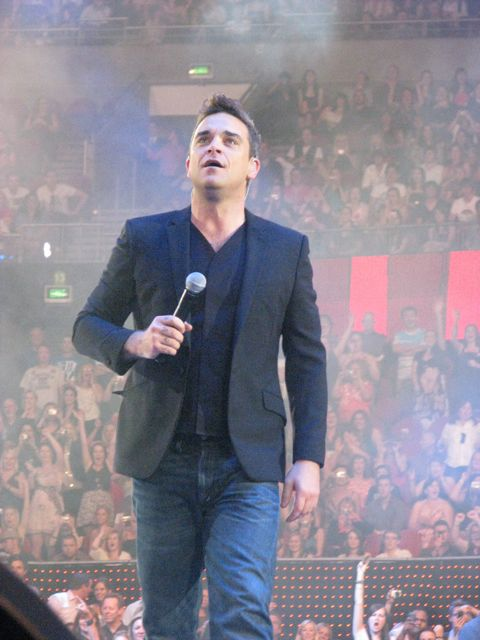
Robbie Williams performing in 2009

English singer Robbie Williams has released eleven video albums and has been featured in fifty-nine music videos and several films.

== Music videos ==
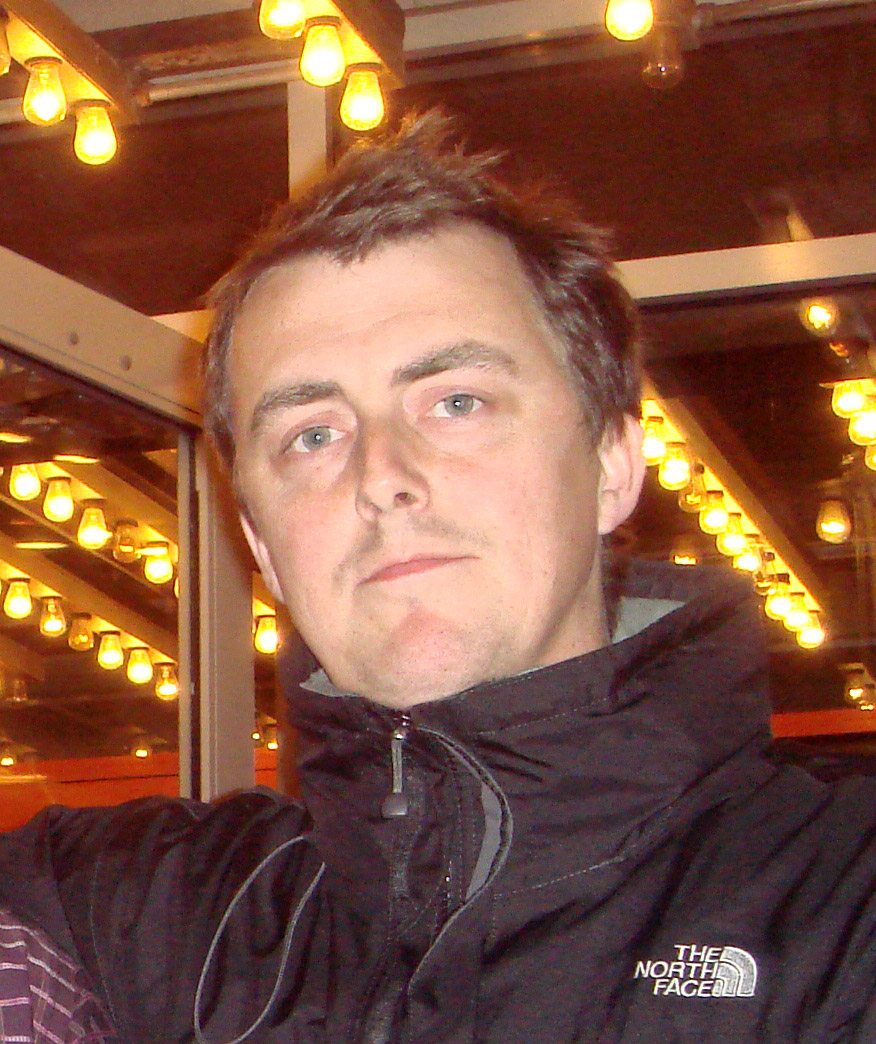
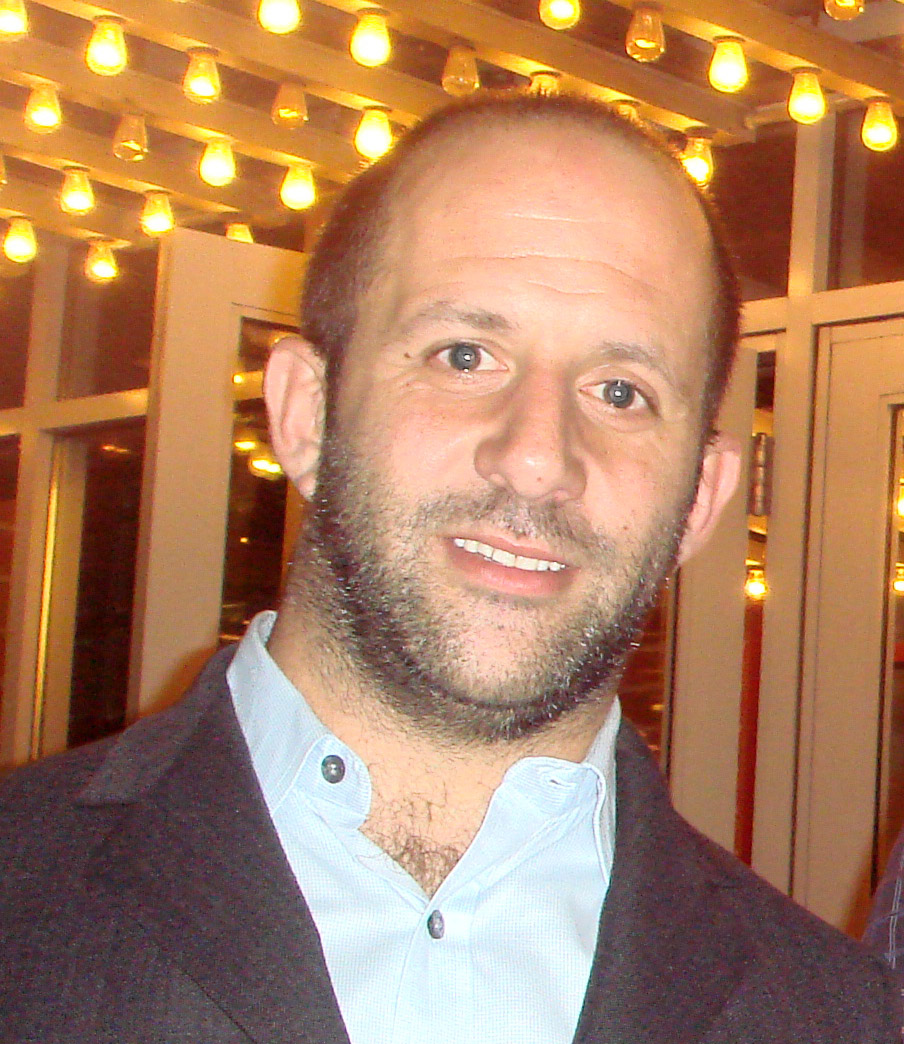
Hammer & Tongs (pictured) directed Williams' video for his 1996 single cover of George Michael's "Freedom"

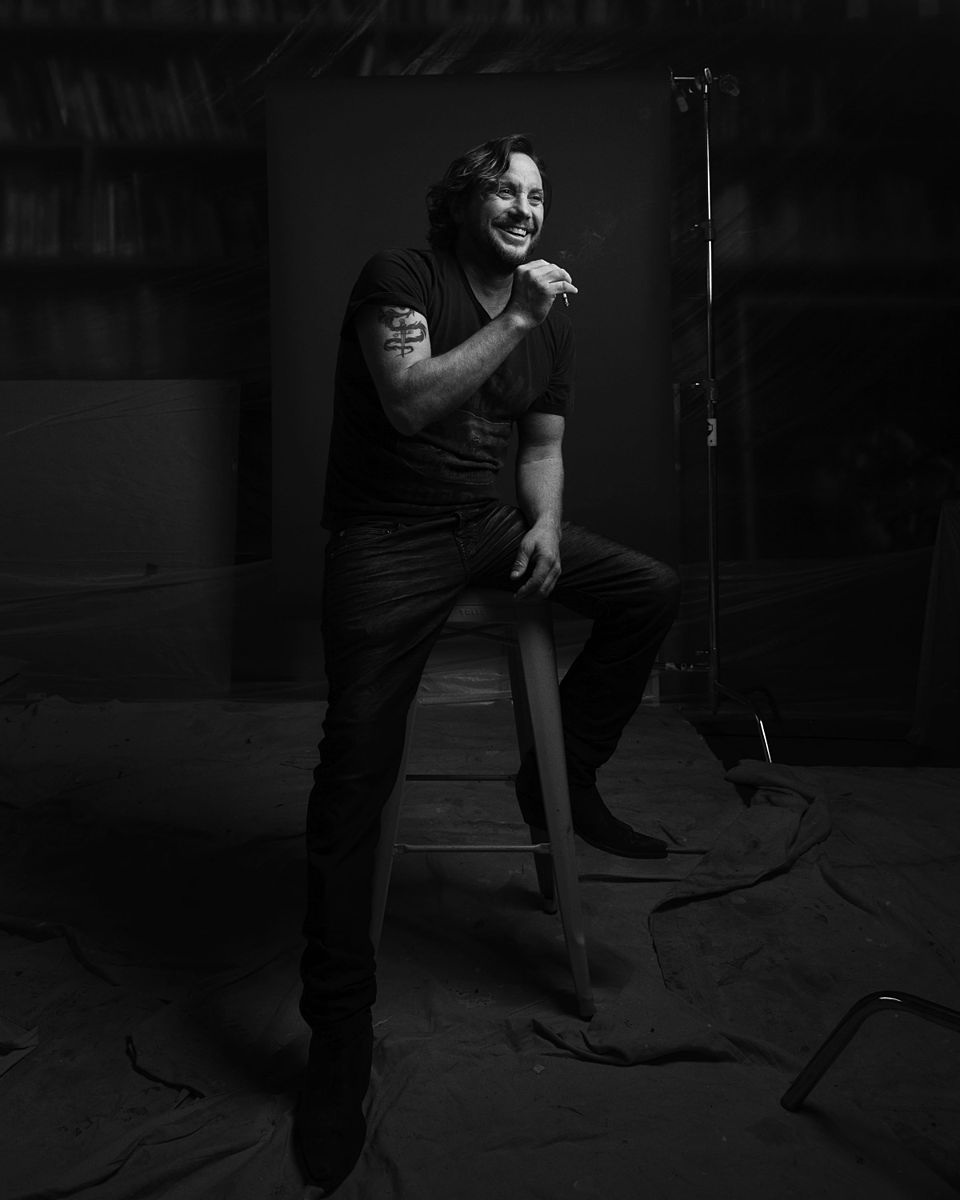
American director Samuel Bayer shot the version 2 of "Angels" in 1999

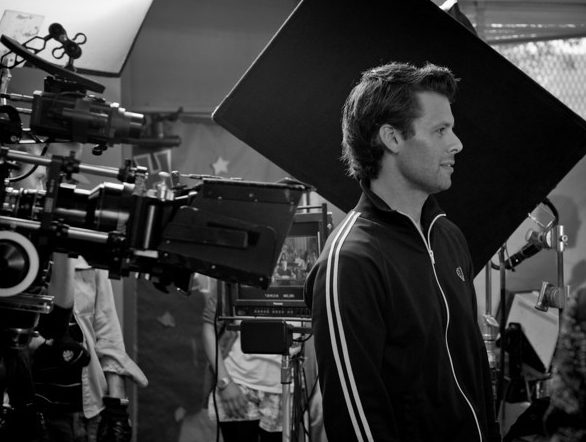
The visual for Williams' 2013 single, "Go Gentle", was directed by Marc Klasfeld

Title	Director(s)	Album	Year	Ref.
"Freedom"	Hammer & Tongs	—N/a	1996	
"Old Before I Die"	David Mould	Life thru a Lens	1997	
"Lazy Days"	Thomas Q Napper	Life thru a Lens	1997	
"South of the Border"	Thomas Q Napper	Life thru a Lens	1997	
"Angels" (version 1)	Vaughan Arnell	Life thru a Lens	1997	
"Let Me Entertain You"	Vaughan Arnell	Life thru a Lens	1998	
"Millennium"	Vaughan Arnell	I've Been Expecting You	1998	
"No Regrets"	Pedro Romhanyi	I've Been Expecting You	1998	
"Strong"	Simon Hilton	I've Been Expecting You	1999	
"She's the One"	Dom and Nic	I've Been Expecting You	1999	
"It's Only Us"	Dom and Nic	I've Been Expecting You	1999	
"Angels" (version 2)	Samuel Bayer	Life thru a Lens	1999	
"Rock DJ"	Vaughan Arnell	Sing When You're Winning	2000	
"Kids" (with Kylie Minogue)	Simon Hilton	Sing When You're Winning	2000	
"Supreme"	Vaughan Arnell	Sing When You're Winning	2000	
"Let Love Be Your Energy"	Olly Reid	Sing When You're Winning	2001	
"Eternity"	Vaughan Arnell	—N/a	2001	
"The Road to Mandalay"	Vaughan Arnell	Sing When You're Winning	2001	
"Somethin' Stupid" (with Nicole Kidman)	Vaughan Arnell	Swing When You're Winning	2001	
"Mr. Bojangles"	Hamish Hamilton	Swing When You're Winning	2002	
"I Will Talk and Hollywood Will Listen"	Hamish Hamilton	Swing When You're Winning	2002	
"My Culture" (with 1 Giant Leap and Maxi Jazz)	Tim Hope	1 Giant Leap	2002	
"Feel"	Vaughan Arnell	Escapology	2002	
"Come Undone"	Jonas Åkerlund	Escapology	2003	
"Something Beautiful"	James Tonkin	Escapology	2003	
"Sexed Up"	Jonas Åkerlund	Escapology	2003	
"Radio"	Vaughan Arnell	Greatest Hits	2004	
"Misunderstood"	Julian Gibbs	Greatest Hits	2004	
"Tripping"	Johan Renck	Intensive Care	2005	
"Make Me Pure"	Russell Thomas	Intensive Care	2005	
"Advertising Space"	David LaChapelle	Intensive Care	2005	
"Sin Sin Sin"	Vaughan Arnell	Intensive Care	2006	
"Rudebox"	Seb Janiak	Rudebox	2006	
"Lovelight"	Jake Nava	Rudebox	2006	
"She's Madonna" (with Pet Shop Boys)	Johan Renck	Rudebox	2007	
"Bodies"	Vaughan Arnell	Reality Killed the Video Star	2009	
"You Know Me"	Vaughan Arnell	Reality Killed the Video Star	2009	
"Morning Sun"	Vaughan Arnell	Reality Killed the Video Star	2010	
"Shame" (with Gary Barlow)	Vaughan Arnell	In and Out of Consciousness: Greatest Hits 1990–2010	2010	
"Candy"	Joseph Kahn	Take the Crown	2012	
"Different"	W.I.Z.	Take the Crown	2012	
"Losers" (with Lissie)	David Dinetz and Dylan Trussell	Take the Crown	2013	
"Be a Boy"	Hamish Hamilton	Take the Crown	2013	
"Goin' Crazy" (with Dizzee Rascal)	Andreas Nilsson	The Fifth	2013	
"Go Gentle" (lyric video)	—N/a	Swings Both Ways	2013	
"Go Gentle"	Marc Klasfeld	Swings Both Ways	2013	
"Dream a Little Dream"	Christopher Sweeney	Swings Both Ways	2013	
"Shine My Shoes" (lyric video)	—N/a	Swings Both Ways	2013	
"Shine My Shoes"	—N/a	Swings Both Ways	2014	
"The Days" (lyric video) (with Avicii)	Jesper Eriksson	The Days / Nights	2014	
"H.E.S."	Greg Williams	Under the Radar Volume 1	2014	
"The Pilot" (lyric video)	—N/a	Under the Radar Volume 1	2014	
"The Edge" (lyric video)	—N/a	Under the Radar Volume 1	2015	
"The Cure" (lyric video)	—N/a	Under the Radar Volume 1	2015	
"Greenlight" (lyric video)	—N/a	Under the Radar Volume 1	2015	
"The Impossible"	Stefano Bertelli	Under the Radar Volume 3	2019	
"Rocket"	Charlie Lightening	Britpop	2025	
"Desire (Official FIFA Anthem)" (with Laura Pausini)	Paolo Carta	—N/a	2025	
"Pretty Face"	Charlie Lightening	Britpop	2025	
"All My Life"	Charlie Lightning	Britpop	2026	

== Video albums ==
List of video albums, with selected chart positions and certifications
Title	Album details	Peak chart positions										Certifications
Title	Album details	UK	AUS	AUT	BEL (FL)	GER	IRL	NLD	NZ	SWE	SWI	Certifications
Live in Your Living Room	Released: 16 November 1998 (UK); Label: EMI; Formats: VHS	3	—	—	—	—	—	—	—	—	—	BPI: Platinum
Where Egos Dare	Released: 13 November 2000 (UK); Label: EMI; Formats: DVD	7	7	—	—	—	—	—	—	—	—	BPI: Gold; ARIA: Platinum
Live at the Albert	Released: 3 December 2001 (UK); Label: EMI; Formats: DVD	1	1	—	—	50	—	—	—	1	—	BPI: 7× Platinum; ARIA: 9× Platinum; BVMI: 2× Platinum; IFPI AUT: 2× Platinum
Nobody Someday	Released: 8 July 2002 (UK); Label: EMI; Formats: DVD	2	5	—	—	88	—	—	—	—	—	BPI: Gold; ARIA: Platinum
The Robbie Williams Show	Released: 31 March 2003 (UK); Label: EMI; Formats: DVD	2	1	—	—	29	—	1	—	3	92	BPI: Platinum; ARIA: 6× Platinum; BVMI: Platinum; IFPI AUT: Platinum
What We Did Last Summer: Live at Knebworth	Released: 24 November 2003 (UK); Label: EMI; Formats: DVD	1	1	3	2	—	3	1	—	3	18	BPI: 6× Platinum; ARIA: 12× Platinum; BVMI: 11× Gold; IFPI AUT: 3× Platinum
And Through It All: Robbie Williams Live 1997–2006	Released: 13 November 2006 (UK); Label: EMI; Formats: DVD	1	1	1	1	5	7	1	10	1	35	BPI: 3× Platinum; ARIA: 6× Platinum; BVMI: 2× Platinum; IFPI AUT: Platinum; IFPI SWI: Gold
In and Out of Consciousness: Greatest Hits 1990–2010	Released: 15 November 2010 (UK); Label: Virgin; Formats: CD, DVD, digital download	—	—	—	—	—	—	—	—	—	—	
The Classic Concerts Collection	Released: 21 March 2011 (UK); Label: Virgin; Formats: CD, DVD	23	—	—	—	—	—	—	—	16	—	
One Night at the Palladium	Released: 9 December 2013 (UK); Label: BBC Worldwide; Formats: DVD	1	—	1	—	16	—	1	—	—	2	BPI: Gold
Live in Tallinn 2013	Released: 5 December 2014; Label: Island Records, Universal Music International; Formats: DVD, Blu-ray	—	—	—	—	—	—	—	—	—	—	
"—" denotes a recording that did not chart or was not released in that territory.

== See also ==
- Take That videography
