= 1999 Tour (Robbie Williams) =

1999 concert tour by Robbie Williams

- Tour by Robbie Williams
- Promotional poster for the tour
- Location: Europe; North America
- Associated album: I've Been Expecting You; The Ego Has Landed
- Start date: 1 May 1999
- End date: 1 November 1999
- Legs: 4
- No. of shows: 44

Robbie Williams concert chronology
- One More for the Rogue Tour (1998–99); 1999 Tour (1999); The Sermon on the Mount Tour (2000–01)

The 1999 Tour was a concert tour by the English recording artist, Robbie Williams. The tour supported his second studio album, I've Been Expecting You and the compilation disc, The Ego Has Landed. Beginning in May 1999, the tour played over 40 shows in North America and Europe. The tour was launched to capitalise on the success of "Angels" in the United States and Canada. The tour also marks Williams's only concert performances in those territories.

Officially, the tour was known as Man, The Myth, The Tax Bill (a.k.a. Born To Be Mild), A Few Dollars More... and Get Your Coat Baby, You've Pulled!.

== Set list ==
The following set list was obtained from the concert held on 1 May 1999, at The Opera House in Toronto, Canada. It does not represent all concerts for the duration of the tour.

1. "Let Me Entertain You"
2. "My Name Is"
3. "Man Machine"
4. "Lazy Days"
5. "Hey Jude"
6. "Win Some Lose Some"
7. "Killing Me"
8. "No Regrets"
9. "Strong"
10. "Angels"
11. "Forever Texas"
12. "Karma Killer"
13. "Old Before I Die"

Encore

14. "Millennium"
15. "Song 2"
16. "Should I Stay or Should I Go"

== Tour dates ==
List of 1999 concerts
Date	City	Country	Venue
1 May 1999	Toronto	Canada	The Opera House
4 May 1999	New York City	United States	Bowery Ballroom
6 May 1999	Philadelphia	United States	Theatre of Living Arts
7 May 1999	Boston	United States	Paradise Rock Club
8 May 1999	Montreal	Canada	Le Petit Medley
10 May 1999	Washington, D.C.	United States	9:30 Club
12 May 1999	Atlanta	United States	Cotton Club
14 May 1999	Chicago	United States	Metro Chicago
15 May 1999	Detroit	United States	Saint Andrew's Hall
1 June 1999	Vancouver	Canada	The Rage
2 June 1999	Seattle	United States	Showbox Comedy and Supper Club
7 June 1999	San Francisco	United States	Bimbo's 365 Club
9 June 1999	Los Angeles	United States	Mayan Theater
21 May 1999^{[A]}	Nürburg	Germany	Nürburgring
23 May 1999^{[B]}	Nuremberg	Germany	Frankenstadion
24 May 1999^{[C]}	Landgraaf	Netherlands	Megaland Landgaaf
18 June 1999^{[D]}	Imola	Italy	Autodromo Enzo e Dino Ferrari
2 July 1999^{[E]}	Roskilde	Denmark	Roskilde Festival Grounds
4 July 1999^{[F]}	Werchter	Belgium	Werchter Festival Grounds
10 July 1999^{[G]}	Paris	France	Hippodrome de Longchamp
25 August 1999	Watford	England	Watford Colosseum
28 August 1999^{[H]}	Slane	Ireland	Slane Castle
3 September 1999	Stockholm	Sweden	Cirkus
5 September 1999	Copenhagen	Denmark	K.B. Hallen
6 September 1999	Hanover	Germany	Capitol
7 September 1999	Cologne	Germany	Palladium
9 September 1999	Offenbach	Germany	Stadthalle Offenbach
10 September 1999	Hamburg	Germany	CCH Hall 2
12 September 1999	Tilburg	Netherlands	013
13 September 1999	Paris	France	Zénith de Paris
15 September 1999	Berlin	Germany	Columbiahalle
17 September 1999	Reykjavík	Iceland	Laugardalshöll
12 October 1999	Boston	United States	Avalon Ballroom
13 October 1999	Upper Darby Township	United States	Tower Theater
15 October 1999	New York City	United States	Hammerstein Ballroom
18 October 1999	Toronto	Canada	The Warehouse
19 October 1999	Kitchener	Canada	Lyric Theatre
21 October 1999	Pittsburgh	United States	Palumbo Center
22 October 1999	Washington, D.C.	United States	9:30 Club
24 October 1999	Atlanta	United States	The Tabernacle
25 October 1999	Orlando	United States	Hard Rock Live
29 October 1999	Houston	United States	Aerial Theater
30 October 1999	Dallas	United States	Bronco Bowl
1 November 1999	Austin	United States	Austin Music Hall

Festivals and other miscellaneous performances
^{A} This concert was a part of the "Rock am Ring"
^{B} This concert was a part of "Rock im Park"
^{C} This concert was a part of the "Pinkpop Festival"
^{D} This concert was a part of the "Heineken Jammin' Festival"
^{E} This concert was a part of the "Roskilde Festival"
^{F} This concert was a part of "Rock Werchter"
^{G} This concert was a part of "Solidays"
^{H} This concert was a part of the "Slane Concert"

== Personnel ==
=== Band ===
- Gary Nuttall
- Chris Sharrock
- Claire Worrall
- Alex Dickson
- Fil Eisler
