= Ego Has Landed Tour =

1998 concert tour by Robbie Williams

- Tour by Robbie Williams
- Location: Europe
- Associated album: Life thru a Lens
- Start date: 15 May 1998
- End date: 29 August 1998
- No. of shows: 21

Robbie Williams concert chronology
- Show Off Must Go On Tour (1997); Ego Has Landed Tour (1998); One More for the Rogue Tour (1998–99)

The Ego Has Landed Tour was the second concert tour by the English recording artist, Robbie Williams. The tour promoted his debut album, Life thru a Lens, and saw Williams performing at bigger venues than his earlier Show Off Must Go On Tour. The singer also performed at several UK music festivals during the summer of 1998.

== Setlist ==
1. "Let Me Entertain You"
2. "I Wouldn't Normally Do This Kind of Thing"
3. "Clean"
4. "South of the Border"
5. "Baby Girl Window"
6. "One of God's Better People"
7. "There She Goes"
8. "Killing Me"
9. "Life Thru a Lens"
10. "Teenage Millionaire"
11. "Lazy Days"
12. "Ego a Go Go"
13. "Old Before I Die"
14. "Angels"
15. "Back for Good"

== Tour dates ==
List of 1998 concerts
Date	City	Country	Venue
15 May 1998	Treforest	Wales	The Basement
16 May 1998	Chalfont St Giles	England	Bucks College Student Union
20 May 1998	Manchester	England	Manchester Apollo
21 May 1998	Sheffield	England	Convocation Hall
22 May 1998	York	England	Barbican Centre
25 May 1998	Middlesbrough	England	Middlesbrough Town Hall
26 May 1998	Hull	England	Hull City Hall
28 May 1998	Blackburn	England	King Georges Hall
30 May 1998	Carlisle	England	The Sands Centre
31 May 1998	Bristol	England	Colston Hall
3 June 1998	London	England	London Forum
4 June 1998	London	England	London Forum
5 June 1998	Birmingham	England	Aston Villa Leisure Centre
8 June 1998	London	England	Royal Albert Hall
27 June 1998^{[A]}	Pilton	England	Worthy Farm
28 June 1998^{[B]}	The Hague	Netherlands	Zuiderpark
11 July 1998^{[C]}	Perth and Kinross	Scotland	Balado
21 August 1998	Liverpool	England	Royal Court Theatre
22 August 1998^{[D]}	Leeds	England	Temple Newsam
23 August 1998^{[D]}	Chelmsford	England	Hylands Park
29 August 1998^{[E]}	Slane	Ireland	Slane Castle

Festivals and other miscellaneous performances
^{A} This concert was a part of the "Glastonbury Festival"
^{B} This concert was a part of "Parkpop"
^{C} This concert is a part of "T in the Park"
^{D} These concerts were a part of "V98"
^{E} This concert was a part of the "Slane Festival"
