= Brit Awards 1999 =

British music awards ceremony

- Date: 16 February 1999
- Venue: London Arena
- Hosted by: Johnny Vaughan
- Most awards: Robbie Williams (3)
- Most nominations: Robbie Williams (6)

Television/radio coverage
- Network: ITV

Brit Awards 1999 was the 19th edition of the Brit Awards, an annual pop music awards ceremony in the United Kingdom. It was organised by the British Phonographic Industry and took place on 16 February 1999 at the London Arena in London. This was the first time the Brit Awards were sponsored by MasterCard.

== Performances ==
Artist(s)	Song(s)	UK Singles Chart reaction	UK Albums Chart reaction
Boyzone featuring Barry McGuigan; Chris Eubank; Nigel Benn	"When the Going Gets Tough"	N/A	Where We Belong - 18 (−9)
Cher	"Believe"	30 (−1)	Believe - 30 (−3)
The Corrs	"Runaway" "Haste To The Wedding"	2 (debut); N/A	Talk on Corners - 1 (+2); Forgiven, Not Forgotten - 7 (+/−)
Eurythmics featuring Stevie Wonder	"Sweet Dreams (Are Made of This)" "Here Comes the Rain Again" "There Must Be An Angel"	N/A; N/A; N/A	Greatest Hits - 11 (+53)
Manic Street Preachers	"You Stole the Sun from My Heart"	N/A	This Is My Truth Tell Me Yours - 9 (+11); Generation Terrorists - 66 (−5); The Holy Bible - 100 (re-entry)
Placebo; David Bowie	"20th Century Boy"	N/A	Without You I'm Nothing - 17 (+8); N/A
Robbie Williams	"Let Me Entertain You"	N/A	I've Been Expecting You - 2 (−1); Life Thru a Lens - 8 (+2)
The Supertroopers (B*Witched, Billie Piper, Cleopatra, Steps and Tina Cousins)	"Thank ABBA for the Music"	N/A	B*Witched - 28 (+11); Honey to the B - 53 (+39); N/A; Step One - 6 (+/−); N/A; N/A
Whitney Houston	"It's Not Right But It's Okay"	N/A	My Love Is Your Love - 37 (+21)

== Winners and nominees ==
British Album of the Year (presented by Mariella Frostrup & Prince Naseem)	Outstanding Contribution to Music (presented by Stevie Wonder)
Manic Street Preachers – This Is My Truth Tell Me Yours; Catatonia – International Velvet; Gomez – Bring It On; Massive Attack – Mezzanine; Robbie Williams – I've Been Expecting You	Eurythmics
British Single of the Year (presented by Sheryl Crow & Meat Loaf)	British Video of the Year (presented by Helen Baxendale & John Thomson)
Robbie Williams – "Angels"; Beautiful South – "Perfect 10"; Catatonia – "Road Rage"; Cornershop – "Brimful of Asha"; Des'ree – "Life"; Fatboy Slim – "The Rockafeller Skank"; Manic Street Preachers – "If You Tolerate This Your Children Will Be Next"; Massive Attack – "Teardrop"; George Michael – "Outside"; Robbie Williams – "Millennium"	Robbie Williams – "Millennium"; All Saints – "Under the Bridge"; Melanie B featuring Missy Elliott – "I Want You Back"; Cornershop – "Brimful of Asha"; Jamiroquai – "Deeper Underground"; Massive Attack – "Teardrop"; George Michael – "Outside"; Placebo – "Pure Morning"; Radiohead – "No Surprises"; Robbie Williams – "Let Me Entertain You"
British Male Solo Artist (presented by Jools Holland & Ian Dury)	British Female Solo Artist (presented by Kulvinder Ghir & Meera Syal as Chunky Lafunga & Smita Smitten)
Robbie Williams; Ian Brown; Bernard Butler; Lynden David Hall; Fatboy Slim	Des'ree; Billie Piper; PJ Harvey; Hinda Hicks; Billie Myers
British Group (presented by Kylie Minogue & Lee Evans)	British Breakthrough Act (presented by Huey Morgan and Zoe Ball)
Manic Street Preachers; Beautiful South; Catatonia; Gomez; Massive Attack	Belle & Sebastian; Another Level; Billie Piper; Cleopatra; Cornershop; Five; Gomez; Hinda Hicks; Propellerheads; Steps
British Dance Act (presented by Sharleen Spiteri & Boy George)	Soundtrack/Cast Recording (presented by Mark Morrison)
Fatboy Slim; All Saints; Faithless; Jamiroquai; Massive Attack	Titanic; Boogie Nights; Jackie Brown; Lock, Stock and Two Smoking Barrels; The Wedding Singer
International Male Solo Artist (presented by Ladysmith Black Mambazo)	International Female Solo Artist (presented by Linor Abargil & Ian Wright)
Beck; Eagle Eye Cherry; Neil Finn; Pras; Will Smith	Natalie Imbruglia; Alanis Morissette; Lauryn Hill; Madonna; Sheryl Crow
International Group (presented by Björn Ulvaeus)	International Breakthrough Act (presented by All Saints)
The Corrs; Air; Beastie Boys; Fun Lovin' Criminals; R.E.M.	Natalie Imbruglia; Air; B*Witched; Eagle Eye Cherry; Savage Garden

== Multiple nominations and awards ==
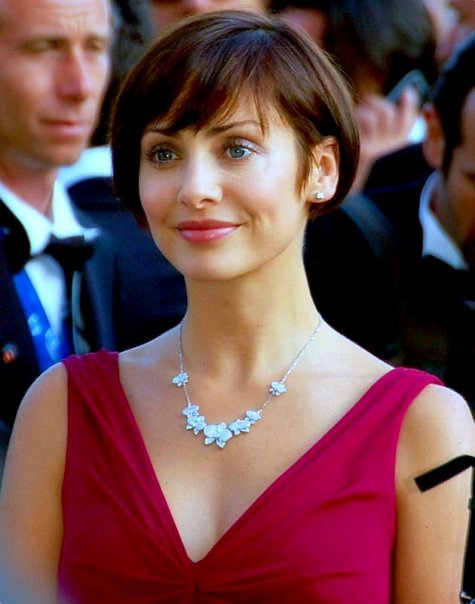
Two-time winner Natalie Imbruglia

Artists that received multiple nominations
Nominations	Artist
6	Robbie Williams
5	Massive Attack
3 (4)	Catatonia
3 (4)	Fatboy Slim
3 (4)	Gomez
3 (4)	Manic Street Preachers
2 (11)	Air
2 (11)	All Saints
2 (11)	The Beautiful South
2 (11)	Billie Piper
2 (11)	Cornershop
2 (11)	Des'ree
2 (11)	Eagle-Eye Cherry
2 (11)	George Michael
2 (11)	Hinda Hicks
2 (11)	Jamiroquai
2 (11)	Natalie Imbruglia

Artists that received multiple awards
Awards	Artist
3	Robbie Williams
2 (2)	Manic Street Preachers
2 (2)	Natalie Imbruglia

== Notable moments ==
=== Belle & Sebastian (1999) ===
In 1999, indie band Belle & Sebastian were nominated for Best British Newcomers, despite having released three albums before the 1999 Awards. The award was sponsored by Radio One and voted for online by their listeners. At the time, Steps were arguably Britain's biggest boy/girl pop band and were also nominated. Despite this, the award was won by Belle & Sebastian. On the Saturday after the awards, a story appeared in the press alleging that the group had rigged the vote in their favour, encouraging students from two universities to vote online. However, fans argued that the band had a predominantly large student following, that band member Isobel Campbell had attended one of the universities in question, and in particular, the award ought to be given on artistic merit as opposed to popularity or CD sales.

Whitney Houston performance

"Despite never taking home a solo trophy, she stunned audiences at the 1999 BRIT Awards with a spectacular performance of her anthemic hit, 'It's Not Right But It's OK."
