= The Ego Has Landed =

Compilation album by Robbie Williams
- Released: 4 May 1999
- Recorded: 1997–1998
- Length: 55:03
- Labels: Capitol; Chrysalis
- Producers: Guy Chambers; Steve Power

Robbie Williams chronology
The Ego Has Landed (1999)	Live at Knebworth (2003)

Robbie Williams chronology
I've Been Expecting You (1998)	The Ego Has Landed (1999)	Sing When You're Winning (2000)

Professional ratings
Review scores
Source	Rating
AllMusic	4/5 stars
Christgau's Consumer Guide	(neither)
Entertainment Weekly	A−
Los Angeles Times	3/4 stars
Pitchfork	2.9/10
Rolling Stone	3.5/5 stars
The Rolling Stone Album Guide	3.5/5 stars
Tom Hull – on the Web	B

The Ego Has Landed is a compilation album by English singer Robbie Williams. After his success around the world, especially in Europe, Williams was signed to Capitol Records in the United States, which was a part of EMI at the time. The album was released in May 1999 in the United States and Canada, and later issued worldwide. All tracks were previously released on Williams' first two albums, Life thru a Lens (1997) and I've Been Expecting You (1998).

== Commercial performance ==
Williams embarked on a US promotional tour and when his first American single, "Millennium" was released, it peaked at No. 72 in the Billboard Hot 100. The album The Ego Has Landed was released in May 1999 in the United States and peaked at No. 63 in the Billboard albums chart, not having the success that he enjoyed in Europe. Despite this, Williams enjoyed good video airplay and received a nomination for the MTV Video Music Awards for "Best Male Video"; he did not win, but the exposure helped the sales of the album.

Capitol Records, trying to make Williams a bigger star, released a second single from the album, the ballad "Angels", for which Williams shot a new video. When it was released in the autumn of that year, the song became a somewhat bigger hit than "Millennium", charting at No. 53. However, this was not enough for Williams, so he concentrated on the rest of the world where he was already an established act. The album went on to sell 598,000 copies in the United States being certified Gold by the RIAA in November of that year.

The compilation was released worldwide (as a limited edition in Europe, pressings for the album are still going strong in Latin America, Asia and New Zealand to this day) and was a huge success in New Zealand, reaching No. 1 on the Official Albums Chart. It went on to sell 140,000 copies being certified 9× Platinum. In Australia, the album ensured platinum sales over 70,000 copies. The album was promoted in Latin America as well. Williams recorded a Spanish version of his hit "Angels" and it was included as a bonus track on the album and then released as a single (almost two years after its original release in English). The Spanish version was a substantial hit in most Latin American countries, but as the single had already been big in 1997, most video and radio outlets focused on the tracks from his album I've Been Expecting You. Despite this, the compilation proved to be a medium success giving him Gold sales in Argentina.

== Track listing ==
No.	Title	Writer(s)	Length
1.	"Lazy Days"	Robbie Williams; Guy Chambers	3:52
2.	"Millennium"	Williams; Chambers; Leslie Bricusse; John Barry	4:04
3.	"No Regrets"	Williams; Chambers	5:09
4.	"Strong"	Williams; Chambers	4:37
5.	"Angels"	Williams; Chambers	4:24
6.	"Win Some Lose Some"	Williams; Chambers	4:18
7.	"Let Me Entertain You"	Williams; Chambers	4:18
8.	"Jesus in a Camper Van"	Williams; Chambers; Loudon Wainwright III	3:38
9.	"Old Before I Die"	Williams; Eric Bazilian; Desmond Child	3:53
10.	"Killing Me"	Williams; Chambers	3:57
11.	"Man Machine"	Williams; Chambers	3:35
12.	"She's the One"	Karl Wallinger	4:18
13.	"Karma Killer"	Williams; Chambers	4:28
14.	"One of God's Better People" (ends at 3:36, with "Hello Sir" starting at 13:36)	Williams; Chambers	15:03
Total length:			69:50

Latin American editions
No.	Title	Writer(s)	Length
15.	"Ángel" (Spanish version)	Williams; Chambers	4:28
Total length:			75:18

Notes

- Tracks 1, 5, 7, 9, 10, and 14 are from Life thru a Lens (1997).
- Tracks 2, 3, 4, 6, 8, 11, 12, and 13 are from I've Been Expecting You (1998).

"One of God's Better People" runs 3:36. After 10 minutes of silence, Williams recites a poem called "Hello Sir", addressed to a teacher who berated him for wanting to become a pop singer. This previously appeared as a hidden track on Life thru a Lens.

== Charts ==
=== Weekly charts ===
Chart (1999–04)	Peak position
Argentine Albums (CAPIF)	17
Australian Albums (ARIA)	20
Canadian Albums (Billboard)	17
New Zealand Albums (RMNZ)	1
US Billboard 200	63

=== Year-end charts ===
Chart (1999)	Position
New Zealand Albums (RMNZ)	5

Chart (2000)	Position
New Zealand Albums (RMNZ)	2

== Certifications ==
Region	Certification	Certified units/sales
Argentina (CAPIF)	Gold	30,000^{^}
Australia (ARIA)	Gold	35,000^{^}
Canada (Music Canada)	Platinum	100,000^{^}
New Zealand (RMNZ)	9× Platinum	135,000^{^}
United Kingdom (BPI)	Gold	100,000^{‡}
United States (RIAA)	Gold	598,000
^{^} Shipments figures based on certification alone.^{‡} Sales+streaming figures based on certification alone.
