= Misunderstood (Robbie Williams song) =

2004 single by Robbie Williams

Single by Robbie Williams

from the album Greatest Hits
- B-side: "Do Me Now" (demo); "Please Please"; "(I Feel It But) I Can't Explain"
- Released: 6 December 2004
- Length: 4:01
- Label: Chrysalis
- Songwriters: Stephen Duffy; Robbie Williams
- Producers: Robbie Williams; Stephen Duffy; Andy Strange

Robbie Williams singles chronology
"Radio" (2004)	"Misunderstood" (2004)	"Tripping" (2005)

Music video
- "Misunderstood" on YouTube

"Misunderstood" is a song by British pop singer Robbie Williams. Williams co-wrote and co-produced the song with Stephen Duffy, who also played the acoustic guitars, bass, and harmonica on the track. The song was released as the second single from Williams' hits compilation Greatest Hits in December 2004, peaking at number eight on the UK Singles Chart and reaching the top 10 in Denmark, Italy, and the Netherlands. The song was featured on the Bridget Jones: The Edge of Reason soundtrack.

== Music video ==
The music video incorporates some of the plot of Bridget Jones: The Edge of Reason into it, including some clips of the movie. Robbie Williams is interrogated by Thai officials. At the end of the video when the main interrogator says that if Williams keeps acting up, he might be there a long time. Williams asks, "How long is a long time?". The interrogator answers, "Oh, about a millennium", to which Williams answers by turning to the camera and singing his song "Millennium". Williams stated that the song was written because of his love of Edward Scissorhands, in which the protagonist of the film was misunderstood.

== Track listings ==
UK CD1 and European CD single

1. "Misunderstood"
2. "Do Me Now" (demo)

UK CD2 and Australian CD single

1. "Misunderstood"
2. "Please Please"
3. "(I Feel It But) I Can't Explain"
4. Gallery and video clip

UK DVD single

1. "Misunderstood" (video—stereo and 5.1 surround sound)
2. "Chemical Devotion" (audio)
3. "The Postcard" (audio)
4. Gallery and video clip

== Credits and personnel ==
Credits are taken from the Greatest Hits album booklet.

Studio

- Mastered at Metropolis Mastering (London, England)

Personnel

- Robbie Williams – writing, lead vocals, production
- Stephen Duffy – writing, acoustic guitars, bass, harmonica, production
- Claire Worrall – backing vocals, piano, string arrangement
- Gary Nuttall – electric guitar
- Melvin Duffy – pedal steel guitar
- Chris Sharrock – drums
- Gavyn Wright – string leader
- Dave Bishop – brass
- Neil Sidwell – brass
- Steve Sidwell – brass
- Andy Strange – production
- Bob Clearmountain – mixing
- Tony Cousins – mastering

== Charts ==
Chart (2004)	Peak position
Australia (ARIA)	39
Austria (Ö3 Austria Top 40)	21
Belgium (Ultratip Bubbling Under Flanders)	3
Belgium (Ultratip Bubbling Under Wallonia)	13
CIS Airplay (TopHit)	113
Denmark (Tracklisten)	9
Europe (Eurochart Hot 100)	17
Europe (European Hit Radio)	7
Germany (GfK)	20
Hungary (Editors' Choice Top 40)	37
Ireland (IRMA)	27
Italy (FIMI)	7
Italy (Musica e dischi)	4
Latvia (Latvijas Top 50)	46
Netherlands (Dutch Top 40)	8
Netherlands (Single Top 100)	15
Romania (Romanian Top 100)	53
Russia Airplay (TopHit)	79
Scottish Singles Sales (Official Charts)	6
Spain (Promusicae)	16
Spain Airplay (Top 40 Radio)	5
Sweden (Sverigetopplistan)	35
Switzerland (Schweizer Hitparade)	26
UK Singles (Official Charts)	8
UK Airplay (Music Week)	13
