= Greatest Hits (Robbie Williams album) =

2004 compilation album by Robbie Williams

Greatest hits album by Robbie Williams
- Released: 18 October 2004
- Recorded: 1997–2004
- Length: 78:43
- Label: EMI
- Producer: Guy Chambers

Robbie Williams chronology
Live at Knebworth (2003)	Greatest Hits (2004)	Intensive Care (2005)

Singles from Greatest Hits
- 1. "Radio" Released: 4 October 2004; 2. "Misunderstood" Released: 6 December 2004

Professional ratings
Review scores
Source	Rating
AllMusic	4.5/5 stars

Greatest Hits is a hits compilation released by English singer-songwriter Robbie Williams on 18 October 2004. The album includes two new songs, "Radio" and "Misunderstood", which were both released as singles. The album is his seventh overall release in the United Kingdom.

Greatest Hits was one of the fastest-selling albums upon release in the UK, where it debuted at the number-one spot with first-week sales of over 320,000 copies. Certain versions of the album feature a picture of Williams in a pose exposing his pubic hair on the cover, and in the booklet is the Latin phrase "...si quid habet mammas vel rotas, res habebis difficiles aliquando", translating into "if it has tits or wheels, it makes life difficult." A special edition box set, containing all of Williams' singles, was released on the same day.

== Singles ==
Although Williams admitted on his website to being "perplexed at the prospect" of a greatest hits album, saying, "I rarely, if at all, look back over my career", he took the opportunity to also reveal two new songs he had been working on with his new collaborator, Stephen Duffy. Both were released as singles. "Radio", the compilation's first single, was released in October 2004, debuting at number-one on the UK Singles Chart, becoming Williams' sixth number-one hit selling 41,732 copies. The song was also a number-one hit in Denmark and Portugal, and it hit the top ten around the world. The album's second single, the ballad "Misunderstood", was included on the soundtrack of the film Bridget Jones: The Edge of Reason, and hit the top ten around the world in December of that year.

== Commercial performance ==
Debuting at number one, the album sold 320,000 copies in its first week, becoming the fastest-selling greatest-hits album ever released in the United Kingdom. The album hit the top spot in 18 countries: France, Italy, Portugal, Spain, the aforementioned United Kingdom, Argentina, Colombia, Germany, Australia, New Zealand, and Switzerland among others. The album became the best-selling album of the year in the United Kingdom, becoming the 61st best-selling album in UK music history, with sales of 2 million copies, being certified 8× Platinum by the BPI.

Greatest Hits also became the best selling album of the year in Europe, being certified 5× Platinum for over 5 million copies sold worldwide. The album ended up selling slightly under 8.5 million copies, becoming one of Williams' best-selling albums ever. In Germany, the album debuted at number one and reached this position in total nine times non-consecutively, Williams' second album to do so, the other one being Swing When You're Winning. With 102 weeks on the German Albums Chart it's his second longest chart one, just behind Sing When You're Winning, with 106 weeks. By selling 900,000 copies and reaching 9× Gold, Greatest Hits is the 20th best-selling album of the decade 2000–2009 in Germany and his 5th album to reach a position in the top twenty of the best-selling album of the decade, the others being Swing When You're Winning (4th best-selling), Escapology (5th best-selling), Intensive Care (8th best-selling) and Live at Knebworth (19th best-selling).

== Track listing ==
UK edition
No.	Title	Original album	Length
1.	"Old Before I Die"	Life thru a Lens, 1997	3:53
2.	"Lazy Days"	Life thru a Lens	3:54
3.	"Angels"	Life thru a Lens	4:25
4.	"Let Me Entertain You"	Life thru a Lens	4:22
5.	"Millennium" (Radio Edit)	I've Been Expecting You, 1998	3:46
6.	"No Regrets" (Radio Edit)	I've Been Expecting You	4:43
7.	"Strong" (Radio Edit)	I've Been Expecting You	4:19
8.	"She's the One"	I've Been Expecting You	4:18
9.	"Rock DJ"	Sing When You're Winning, 2000	4:16
10.	"Kids" (with Kylie Minogue)	Sing When You're Winning and Light Years, both 2000	4:19
11.	"Supreme"	Sing When You're Winning	4:18
12.	"Let Love Be Your Energy" (Radio Edit)	Sing When You're Winning	4:06
13.	"Eternity"	Non-album single, 2001	5:00
14.	"The Road to Mandalay" (Radio Edit)	Sing When You're Winning	3:18
15.	"Feel" (Radio Edit)	Escapology, 2002	3:43
16.	"Come Undone" (Radio Edit)	Escapology	3:54
17.	"Sexed Up" (Radio Edit)	Escapology	4:10
18.	"Radio"	Previously unreleased, 2004	3:52
19.	"Misunderstood"	Previously unreleased	4:01

Asian edition
No.	Title	Original album	Length
2.	"Angels"		4:25
3.	"Let Me Entertain You"		4:22
4.	"Millennium"		4:07
5.	"No Regrets"		5:10
6.	"Strong"		4:39
7.	"She's the One"		4:18
8.	"Rock DJ"		4:18
9.	"Kids" (With Kylie Minogue)		4:46
10.	"Supreme"		4:18
11.	"Let Love Be Your Energy"		4:59
12.	"Eternity"		5:00
13.	"The Road to Mandalay"		4:03
14.	"Better Man"	Sing When You're Winning	3:22

Australian edition
No.	Title	Original album	Length
2.	"Angels"		4:25
3.	"Let Me Entertain You"		4:22
4.	"Millennium"		4:07
5.	"No Regrets"		5:10
6.	"Strong"		4:39
7.	"She's the One"		4:18
8.	"Rock DJ"		4:18
9.	"Kids" (with Kylie Minogue)		4:46
10.	"Supreme"		4:18
11.	"Better Man"		3:22
12.	"Let Love Be Your Energy"		4:59
13.	"Feel"		4:23
14.	"Come Undone"		4:38
15.	"Sexed Up"		4:21
16.	"Something Beautiful"	Escapology	4:48
17.	"Monsoon"	Escapology	3:46

New Zealand edition
No.	Title	Original album	Length
1.	"Angels"		4:25
2.	"Let Me Entertain You"		4:22
3.	"Millennium"		4:07
4.	"No Regrets"		5:10
5.	"Strong"		4:39
6.	"She's the One"		4:18
7.	"Win Some Lose Some"	I've Been Expecting You	4:18
8.	"Rock DJ"		4:18
9.	"Kids" (with Kylie Minogue)		4:46
10.	"Supreme"		4:18
11.	"Let Love Be Your Energy"		4:59
12.	"Eternity"		5:00
13.	"Better Man"		3:22
14.	"Feel"		4:23
15.	"Come Undone"		4:38
16.	"Something Beautiful"		4:48

South American edition
No.	Title	Length
2.	"Angels"	4:25
3.	"Let Me Entertain You"	4:22
4.	"Millennium"	4:07
5.	"No Regrets"	5:10
6.	"Strong"	4:39
7.	"She's the One"	4:18
8.	"Angels" (Spanish Version)	4:25

Argentine edition
No.	Title	Length
2.	"Angels"	4:27
3.	"Let Me Entertain You"	4:22
4.	"Millennium"	3:46
5.	"No Regrets"	4:43
6.	"Strong"	4:19
7.	"Angels" (Spanish Version)	4:28
8.	"Rock DJ"	4:16
9.	"Kids" (with Kylie Minogue)	4:19
10.	"Better Man"	3:21
11.	"Supreme"	4:15
12.	"Let Love Be Your Energy"	4:06
13.	"Eternity"	5:00
14.	"The Road To Mandalay"	3:18
15.	"Better Man" (Spanish Version)	3:21
16.	"Feel"	3:43
17.	"Come Undone"	3:54

French edition
No.	Title	Length
11.	"Supreme" (French Version)	4:18

== The Best So Far ==
The Best So Far

Greatest hits album by Robbie Williams
- Released: 2 September 2006
- Recorded: 1997–2004
- Length: 58:47
- Label: Som Livre

Robbie Williams chronology
Intensive Care (2005)	The Best So Far (2006)	Rudebox (2006)

The Best So Far is an updated version of Greatest Hits, released exclusively in Brazil to celebrate Robbie's Close Encounters tour. Even with Greatest Hits being released in Brazil, The Best So Far updates the track listing slightly, adding "Sin Sin Sin", "Advertising Space" and "Tripping", but removing earlier hits such as "Old Before I Die", "Lazy Days" and "She's the One".

Track listing

1. "Sin Sin Sin" – 4:05
2. "Advertising Space" – 4:37
3. "Feel" – 3:43
4. "Angels" – 4:25
5. "Sexed Up" – 4:10
6. "Millennium" – 3:47
7. "Come Undone" – 3:54
8. "Rock DJ" – 4:16
9. "Supreme" – 4:15
10. "Tripping" – 4:36
11. "No Regrets" – 4:44
12. "Radio" – 3:51
13. "Misunderstood" – 4:02
14. "Let Me Entertain You" – 4:21

== Charts ==
=== Weekly charts ===
Chart (2004-2005)	Peak position
Argentine Albums (CAPIF)	1
Australian Albums (ARIA)	1
Austrian Albums (Ö3 Austria)	1
Belgian Albums (Ultratop Flanders)	2
Belgian Albums (Ultratop Wallonia)	2
Danish Albums (Hitlisten)	3
Dutch Albums (Album Top 100)	1
European Albums (Billboard)	1
Finnish Albums (Suomen virallinen lista)	3
German Albums (Offizielle Top 100)	1
Hungarian Albums (MAHASZ)	7
Icelandic Albums (Tónlist)	2
Irish Albums (IRMA)	1
Italian Albums (FIMI)	1
Japanese Albums (Oricon)	60
Mexican Albums (AMPROFON)	3
New Zealand Albums (RMNZ)	1
Norwegian Albums (VG-lista)	2
Portuguese Albums (AFP)	1
Scottish Albums (Official Charts)	1
Singaporean Albums (RIAS)	2
South African Albums (RISA)	4
Spanish Albums (Promusicae)	8
Swedish Albums (Sverigetopplistan)	2
Swiss Albums (Schweizer Hitparade)	1
Taiwanese Albums (Five Music)	6
UK Albums (Official Charts)	1

=== Year-end charts ===
Chart (2004)	Position
Australian Albums (ARIA)	4
Austrian Albums (Ö3 Austria)	6
Belgian Albums (Ultratop Flanders)	11
Belgian Albums (Ultratop Wallonia)	13
Dutch Albums (Album Top 100)	6
European Top 100 Albums (Billboard)	9
German Albums (Offizielle Top 100)	7
Hungarian Albums (MAHASZ)	31
Irish Albums (IRMA)	7
Italian Albums (FIMI)	2
New Zealand Albums (RMNZ)	26
Swedish Albums (Sverigetopplistan)	17
Swiss Albums (Schweizer Hitparade)	5
UK Albums (OCC)	3
Worldwide Albums (IFPI)	6

Chart (2005)	Position
Australian Albums (ARIA)	11
Austrian Albums (Ö3 Austria)	6
Belgian Albums (Ultratop Flanders)	21
Belgian Albums (Ultratop Wallonia)	44
Dutch Albums (Album Top 100)	9
European Albums (Billboard)	5
German Albums (Offizielle Top 100)	5
Hungarian Albums (MAHASZ)	93
Italian Albums (FIMI)	21
Mexican Albums (AMPROFON)	8
Swiss Albums (Schweizer Hitparade)	5
UK Albums (OCC)	71

Chart (2006)	Position
Australian Albums (ARIA)	52
Austrian Albums (Ö3 Austria)	30
European Albums (Billboard)	60
German Albums (Offizielle Top 100)	52
UK Albums (OCC)	90

=== Decade-end charts ===
Chart (2000–2009)	Position
Australian Albums (ARIA)	9
UK Albums (OCC)	19

== Certifications ==
Region	Certification	Certified units/sales
Argentina (CAPIF)	7× Platinum	280,000^{^}
Australia (ARIA)	8× Platinum	560,000^{^}
Austria (IFPI Austria)	4× Platinum	120,000^{*}
Belgium (BRMA)	2× Platinum	100,000^{*}
Denmark (IFPI Danmark)	Platinum	40,000^{^}
Finland (Musiikkituottajat)	Platinum	40,367
France (SNEP)	Platinum	300,000^{*}
Germany (BVMI)	9× Gold	900,000^{^}
Hungary (MAHASZ)	Gold	10,000^{^}
Mexico (AMPROFON)	2× Platinum	200,000^{^}
Netherlands (NVPI)	Platinum	80,000^{^}
New Zealand (RMNZ)	2× Platinum	30,000^{^}
Portugal (AFP)	Platinum	40,000^{^}
South Africa (RISA)	Platinum	50,000^{*}
Spain (Promusicae)	Platinum	100,000^{^}
Sweden (GLF)	Gold	30,000^{^}
Switzerland (IFPI Switzerland)	3× Platinum	120,000^{^}
United Kingdom (BPI)	8× Platinum	2,400,000^{‡}
Summaries
Europe (IFPI)	5× Platinum	5,000,000^{*}
^{*} Sales figures based on certification alone.^{^} Shipments figures based on certification alone.^{‡} Sales+streaming figures based on certification alone.

== See also ==
- List of best-selling albums of the 2000s (decade) in the United Kingdom
