= Gary Nuttall =

- Born: Liverpool, England
- Genres: Rock, soft rock, pop rock, pop
- Occupations: Musician, songwriter, singer
- Instruments: Guitar, bass, keyboards, vocals
- Years active: 1991-present
- Website: garynuttall.com

Gary Nuttall is an English musician and vocalist, best known for his long-time affiliation with Robbie Williams, spanning from 1997 to the present day.

== Solo ==
In 2007, Nuttall released his first solo album, Dated Bedroom Ditties.

== Discography ==
=== Solo ===
- Dated Bedroom Ditties (2007)

=== Robbie Williams ===
- Life thru a Lens (1997)
- I've Been Expecting You (1998)
- The Ego Has Landed (1999)
- Sing When You're Winning (2000)
- Escapology (2002)
- Live at Knebworth (2003)
- Greatest Hits (2004)
- Intensive Care (2005)
- In and Out of Consciousness: Greatest Hits 1990–2010 (2010)
- Swings Both Ways (2013)
- Under the Radar Volume 1 (2014)
- The Heavy Entertainment Show (2016)
- Under the Radar Volume 2 (2017)
- Under the Radar Volume 3 (2019)
- Britpop (2026)

=== As writer ===
- She Makes Me High (1997)
- Get The Joke (1997)
- Often (2000)

=== Appearances in videos ===
Nuttall appears in the following videos.

- South of the Border (1997)
- Let Me Entertain You (1998)
- Strong (1999)
- Dance with the Devil (2000)
- Better Man (2001)
- Make Me Pure (2005)
- Shine My Shoes (2014)
- Merry Xmas Everybody (2019)
- Rocket (2025)
- All My Life (2026)
