= Angels (Robbie Williams song) =

1997 single by Robbie Williams

Single by Robbie Williams

from the album Life thru a Lens
- B-side: "Karaoke Overkill"; "Get the Joke"; "Back for Good" (live); 1. "Walk This Sleigh"
- Released: 1 December 1997
- Studio: Matrix Maison Rouge (London, England)
- Length: 4:24 (album version); 3:58 (radio edit)
- Label: Chrysalis
- Songwriters: Robbie Williams; Guy Chambers
- Producers: Guy Chambers; Steve Power

Robbie Williams singles chronology
"South of the Border" (1997)	"Angels" (1997)	"Let Me Entertain You" (1998)

Music videos
- "Angels" on YouTube
- "Angels (XXV)" on YouTube

"Angels" is a song by the English singer Robbie Williams, released as the fourth single from his debut solo album, Life thru a Lens, on 1 December 1997 by Chrysalis. It was produced by Guy Chambers and Steve Power.

The Irish singer-songwriter Ray Heffernan asserts that he wrote the first version of "Angels" in 1996 and finished it with Williams. Williams confirmed that he recorded a demo with Heffernan but said he rewrote it significantly with Chambers. To avoid a lawsuit, Williams bought the song rights from Heffernan before it was released. He has never confirmed that Heffernan wrote it.

"Angels" reached number four on the UK singles chart and number 53 on the US Billboard Hot 100 chart. As of 2014, it had sold more than 1.16 million copies in the UK. It won the 1999 Ivor Novello Award for Best Song Musically and Lyrically and was voted the best song of the previous 25 years at the 2005 Brit Awards. In 2005, Britons voted it the song they most wanted played at their funeral. The success helped make Williams one of the biggest British pop stars of the era.

"Angels" has been covered by artists including Jessica Simpson, David Archuleta, Beverley Knight, All Angels, Declan Galbraith and Josh Groban. It was recorded in Spanish (as "Ángel") by the Mexican singers Yuridia and Marco Moré, in Italian (as "Un Angelo") by Patrizio Buanne and in Brazilian Portuguese (as "Um Anjo") by KLB.

== Authorship ==
Robbie Williams said he wrote "Angels" with his collaborator Guy Chambers in 25 minutes. By his account, he and Chambers were sitting outside a café watching a water fountain, which inspired them to write the chorus. In 2016, Williams said: "It was the first of our songs that we wrote together. We could tell and hoped and prayed that we got something incredibly special." He expressed irritation that some assumed Chambers was the sole author. Chambers said he wrote the music, and Williams the lyrics and melody: "It was very equal. Rob knew exactly what he wanted to say, and how he wanted to say it." Williams said he wrote the lyrics about his aunt and uncle, and about his belief in the afterlife: "It's about the thoughts that loved ones that have passed on come back and take care of you."

The Irish singer-songwriter Ray Heffernan asserts that he wrote the first version of "Angels" after his girlfriend had a miscarriage. The lyrics express the thought that "I won't have a baby to love so I'll love an angel instead". Heffernan says he met Williams in a pub by chance in Dublin in 1996, and played him an incomplete version. That week, the two recorded a studio demo. Williams confirmed that he had recorded a demo with Heffernan but said he rewrote the song significantly with Chambers. He has never confirmed that Heffernan wrote the song, calling him a "fantasist". Heffernan believes that Williams was seeking recognition as a songwriter at the time, and to have credited Heffernan would have damaged Williams' credibility.

Before the song's release, Heffernan accepted an offer from Williams to buy the rights. According to Heffernan, he was initially offered £2,500, which rose to £7,500 when he asked for a writing credit. He said: "I was mostly thrilled. That’s what you're supposed to do, right? Sell your songs to pop stars." He is thanked in the UK CD2 single liner notes. Williams said: "We could have gone to court, and it all would have been down to whether what way the judge wakes up that day out of bed ... So I gave him some money, and he went away."

In 2011, Heffernan said was once angry about the situation but that "Angels" had earned him connections with publishing companies. In 2023, he said he did not regret earning no royalties, as this would have enabled his destructive use of drugs at the time. However, he was hurt that Williams had accepted an Ivor Novello Award for writing "Angels" in 1999 and had never acknowledged his authorship. He said: "That's what the young kid in me really wants — acknowledgement. It's not about the millions." As of 2023, Heffernan was working as a language teacher in rural Italy.

According to Heffernan, in September 2024, he privately sent Williams a hand-written letter to his Instagram account. The following day, Williams made a public post reading "Look, I did answer / I answered by not answering", which Heffernan interpreted as a cryptic response. In August 2025, Heffernan said he planned to pursue legal action under a new part of EU copyright law that allows creators to seek retrospective compensation for successful works. He sought around a third of future royalties.

== Music videos ==
The video for "Angels" was directed by Vaughan Arnell and filmed at Saunton Sands in Devon. Williams walks along a beach, stares at the sky, kicks a football and rides a motorbike with a woman while a helicopter flies around them. In 1999, a second video was filmed for the US market in which Williams watches a city from a rooftop.

== Release ==
After Williams left Take That to pursue a solo career in 1995, two of his singles reached number two on the UK singles chart. However, his fourth single reached number 14, suggesting his popularity was declining.

"Angels" was released as the fourth single from Williams's debut album, Life Thru a Lens (1997). Though it only reached number 4 on the UK singles chart, it was a consistent seller. It spent a total of 12 weeks in the top 10 and 17 weeks in the top 75. In the UK, it was the 38th-bestselling single of 1997, the 25th-bestselling of 1998 and the 34th-bestselling single of the decade. As of 2014, it had sold more than 1.16 million copies in the UK. Williams also recorded a Spanish version. The success helped make Williams one of the biggest British pop stars of the late 1990s and early 2000s.

In the US, it was less successful. "Angels" was released in 1999 after Williams' debut there with his single "Millennium". It reached number 53, becoming his highest-charting US single. "Angels" re-entered the ARIA Top 100 at No. 91, on 5 May 2008. In 2022, Williams released a reworked version, "Angels (XXV)", from his compilation album XXV. It reached number 92 on the UK singles chart on 10 June.

== Reception ==
Aberdeen Press and Journal said "Angels" was perhaps the strongest song from Life thru a Lens. John Bush from AllMusic noted Williams' "crooning". Larry Flick of Billboard described it as a "sweet ballad that never gets sappy". He noted that the production is "first-rate, the lyric is thoughtful and ear-grabbing, and his smoky, crisp vocal is a sheer delight. All that and a chorus to kill for." An editor for Daily Record felt Williams had "come of age with this melodic pop ballad" and complimented a "surprisingly grown-up sounding Robbie on what is his best tune to date". The Irish Independent called it an "epic ballad".

Music & Media wrote: "With songs of the quality of 'Angels', Robbie Williams is on his way towards extending his audience by drawing in older listeners ... [It] distinguishes itself from its indie rock-inspired predecessors 'Old Before I Die' and 'Lazy Days' by exchanging their guitars for a more mellow, piano-based arrangement." Music Week gave "Angels" four out of five, likening it to Elton John and saying it suggested that Williams would be more successful than his former Take That bandmate Gary Barlow. The Pitchfork writer Michael Sandlin called it a "pink feather-boa'd Elton John mishap" with a guitar imitating George Harrison.

In 2017, Dave Fawbert from ShortList declared "Angels" "genuinely brilliant", with "a pretty understated vocal from Robbie. Nothing too over the top, just sincere." The Guardian critic Alexis Petridis wrote in 2022 that "Angels" was "so ubiquitous for so long that it is almost impossible for anyone of a certain age to listen to it objectively: throughout the late 90s and 00s, it wasn't so much a song as an unavoidable fact of daily life. Most pop songwriters would kill to come up with something with such impact and longevity." In 2025, the Guardian writer Ian Gittins described "Angels" as "the ubiquitous national anthem of the 90s".

"Angels" won the Ivor Novello Award for Best Song Musically and Lyrically in 1999. In 2003, Q named it the 237th-best song of all time. In a 2004 poll of almost 30,000 people by VH1, "Angels" was voted the best single that never reached number one. At the 2005 Brit Awards, where Williams performed it with Joss Stone, the British public voted "Angels" the best British song of the past 25 years. In a 2005 survey of more than 45,000 people by Music Choice, Britons chose "Angels" as the song they would most like played at their funeral.

== Live performances ==
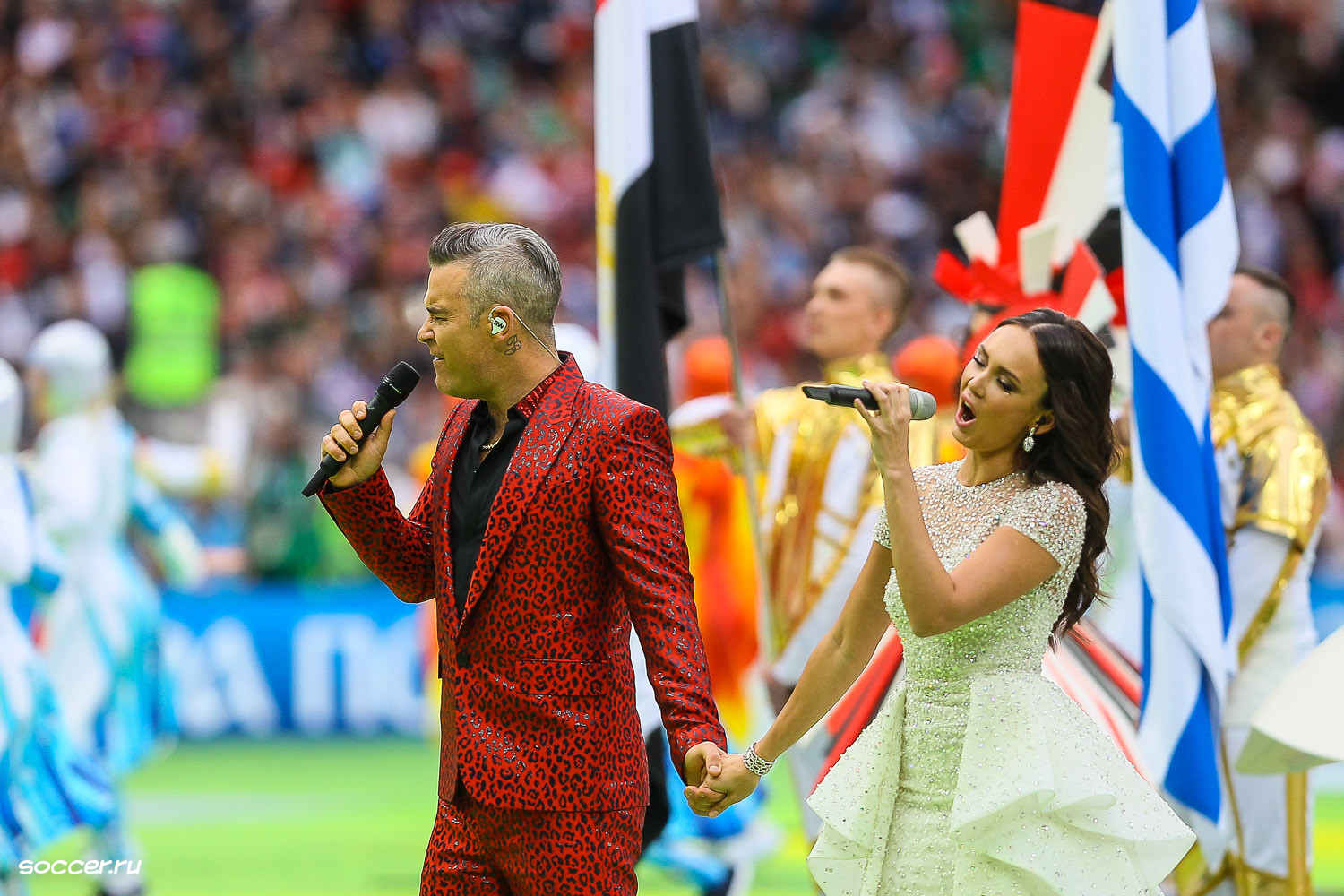
Williams and Russian soprano Aida Garifullina performing "Angels" at the 2018 FIFA World Cup opening ceremony in Moscow, Russia

In 2009, Williams performed "Angels" at the final of the sixth series of The X Factor with Olly Murs. On 14 June 2018, Williams performed "Angels" with the Russian soprano Aida Garifullina at the 2018 FIFA World Cup opening ceremony held at the Luzhniki Stadium in Moscow, Russia. On 23 June 2018, Williams performed "Angels" with the American singer Taylor Swift at Wembley Stadium, London, during her Reputation Stadium Tour.

== Formats and track listings ==
- UK CD1
1. "Angels" – 4:24
2. "Karaoke Overkill" – 3:31
3. "Get the Joke" – 3:03
4. "Angels" (acoustic version) – 4:27
- UK CD2 and cassette single
1. "Angels" – 4:24
2. "Back for Good" (live version) – 3:59
3. "Walk This Sleigh" – 3:01
- European CD single
1. "Angels" – 4:24
2. "Walk This Sleigh" – 3:01
- Australian CD single (1997)
1. "Angels" – 4:24
2. "Karaoke Overkill" – 3:31
3. "Get the Joke" – 3:03
- Australian CD single (1999)
1. "Angels" – 4:24
2. "It's Only Us" – 2:50
3. "Angels" (live) – 5:39
4. "Let Me Entertain You" (live at The Brits '99) – 4:41
5. "Millennium" – 4:05

== Credits and personnel ==
Credits are taken from the Life thru a Lens album booklet.

Studios

- Recorded at Matrix Maison Rouge (London, England)
- Mixed at Battery Studios (London, England)

Personnel

- Robbie Williams – writing, vocals
- Guy Chambers – writing, keyboards, production, arrangement
- Gary Nuttall – backing vocals, guitar
- Andre Barreau – backing vocals, guitar
- Nicole Patterson – backing vocals
- Chester Kamen – guitar
- Mark Smith – bass, programming
- Steve Power – keyboards, production, mixing, programming
- Chris Sharrock – drums
- Andy Duncan – percussion
- The London Session Orchestra – orchestra
- Gavyn Wright – concertmaster
- Jim Brumby – Battery Studios assistant
- Matt Hay – Matrix Maison Rouge assistant

== Charts ==
=== Weekly charts ===
Chart (1997–2000)	Peak position
Australia (ARIA)	40
Austria (Ö3 Austria Top 40)	12
Belgium (Ultratop 50 Flanders)	6
Belgium (Ultratop 50 Wallonia)	32
Canada Top Singles (RPM)	18
Canada Adult Contemporary (RPM)	15
Estonia (Eesti Top 20)	3
Europe (Eurochart Hot 100)	7
Europe (European Hit Radio)	4
Finland Airplay (Radiosoittolista)	12
France (SNEP)	7
France Airplay (SNEP)	2
Germany (GfK)	9
Greece (IFPI Greece)	3
Iceland (Íslenski Listinn Topp 40)	22
Ireland (IRMA)	2
Italy (FIMI)	6
Italy Airplay (Music & Media)	2
Latvia (Latvijas Top 40)	7
Netherlands (Dutch Top 40)	14
Netherlands (Single Top 100)	14
New Zealand (Recorded Music NZ)	23
Nicaragua (El Siglo de Torreón)	8
Scottish Singles Sales (Official Charts)	2
Spain Airplay (Top 40 Radio)	14
Sweden (Sverigetopplistan)	13
Switzerland (Schweizer Hitparade)	4
UK Singles (Official Charts)	4
UK Airplay (Music Week)	1
US Billboard Hot 100	53
US Adult Contemporary (Billboard)	10
US Adult Pop Airplay (Billboard)	21
US Pop Airplay (Billboard)	25
US Adult Contemporary (Radio & Records)	6
US CHR/Pop Top 50 (Radio & Records)	25
US Hot AC (Radio & Records)	21

Chart (2025)	Peak position
Israel International Airplay (Media Forest)	12

=== Year-end charts ===
Chart (1997)	Position
UK Singles (OCC)	39

Chart (1998)	Position
Belgium (Ultratop 50 Flanders)	39
Brazil (Crowley)	97
Europe (Eurochart Hot 100)	24
Europe (European Hit Radio)	32
France (SNEP)	43
France Airplay (SNEP)	30
Germany (Media Control)	53
Latvia (Latvijas Top 50)	58
Netherlands (Dutch Top 40)	65
Netherlands (Single Top 100)	65
Sweden (Hitlistan)	97
Switzerland (Schweizer Hitparade)	36
UK Singles (OCC)	25
UK Airplay (Music Week)	1

Chart (1999)	Position
Canada Adult Contemporary (RPM)	85
US Adult Top 40 (Billboard)	84
US Hot AC (Radio & Records)	87

Chart (2000)	Position
US Adult Contemporary (Billboard)	28
US Adult Top 40 (Billboard)	62
US Adult Contemporary (Radio & Records)	28
US Hot AC (Radio & Records)	76

Chart (2006)	Position
UK Singles (OCC)	198

Year-end chart performance
Chart (2025)	Position
Estonia Airplay (TopHit)	185

== Certifications ==
Region	Certification	Certified units/sales
Belgium (BRMA)	Gold	25,000^{*}
Brazil (Pro-Música Brasil)	Gold	30,000^{‡}
Denmark (IFPI Danmark)	Platinum	90,000^{‡}
France (SNEP)	Gold	250,000^{*}
Germany (BVMI)	Platinum	500,000^{‡}
Italy (FIMI)	Platinum	70,000^{‡}
New Zealand (RMNZ)	3× Platinum	90,000^{‡}
Spain (Promusicae)	Platinum	60,000^{‡}
United Kingdom (BPI)	4× Platinum	2,400,000^{‡}
^{*} Sales figures based on certification alone.^{‡} Sales+streaming figures based on certification alone.

== Release history ==
Region	Date	Format(s)	Label(s)	Ref.
United Kingdom	1 December 1997	CD; cassette	Chrysalis	
United States	6 September 1999	Hot adult contemporary radio	Capitol	
United States	7 September 1999	Contemporary hit radio	Capitol	

== Cover versions ==
=== Jessica Simpson ===
"Angels"

Single by Jessica Simpson

from the album In This Skin (reissue)
- Released: 8 June 2004
- Studio: Turtle Sound (New York City); Steakhouse (Los Angeles)
- Length: 4:05
- Label: Columbia
- Producer: Billy Mann

Jessica Simpson singles chronology
"Take My Breath Away" (2004)	"Angels" (2004)	"These Boots Are Made for Walkin'" (2005)

Licensed audio
- "Angels" on YouTube

Jessica Simpson's cover of "Angels" was the fourth and final single released from her album In This Skin in 2004. It was produced by Billy Mann.

==== Music video ====
The video for "Angels" opens with a visibly anxious Simpson on an empty stage rehearsing for a performance. She can be seen in intercut scenes staring into space, as if she has lost her self-confidence and ability to perform. As the song progresses, however, white roses can be seen scattered around her as a sign of hope, and soon Simpson begins to regain her confidence. The song then shifts into its instrumental bridge to correlate with the emotions of the characters, as Simpson proceeds to climb to the top of the building for her final performance. There she is greeted by a youth orchestra, and finishes the song.

==== Chart performance ====
Simpson's version of "Angels" failed to enter the Billboard Hot 100, though it did reach number six on the Billboard Bubbling Under Hot 100 Singles chart. It also entered the top 30 in Australia and Canada.

==== Track listing ====
1. "Angels"
2. "Angels" (Stealth Remix)
3. "Fly" (B-side)
4. "Angels" (enhanced video)

==== Remixes ====
- "Angels" (album version) – 4:00
- "Angels" (Dave Anthony Remix) – 4:53
- "Angels" (Junior Vasquez World Mixshow) – 6:32
- "Angels" (Stealth Remix) – 3:12
- "Angels" (acoustic) – 4:07

==== Charts ====
Chart (2004)	Peak position
Australia (ARIA)	27
Canada CHR/Pop Top 30 (Radio & Records)	29
Romania (Romanian Top 100)	78
US Bubbling Under Hot 100 (Billboard)	6
US Pop Airplay (Billboard)	23

==== Release history ====
Release dates and formats for "Angels"
Region	Date	Format	Label	Ref.
United States	8 June 2004	Contemporary hit radio	Columbia	

=== Yuridia ===
"Ángel"

Single by Yuridia

from the album La Voz de un Ángel
- Released: 24 July 2005
- Recorded: 2005
- Studio: Azteca Music (Mexico City)
- Genre: Latin, pop
- Length: 4:17
- Label: Sony BMG
- Producer: Azteca Music

Yuridia singles chronology
"Ángel" (2005)	"La maldita primavera" (2006)

In 2005, Yuridia, a former contestant of the Mexican show La Academia, released "Ángel", a Spanish version of the song which she had interpreted during her stay in the reality show, as her debut and lead single from her album La Voz de un Ángel. In Mexico, as well as in other parts of Latin America, "Ángel", became an instant hit, leading her debut album of almost the same name to achieve Diamond status in Mexico and becoming one of the most recent best selling Mexican singers and the best female Mexican seller of the past decade. The singer received two gold certifications for 20,000 copies sold in Mexico.

==== Chart performance ====
"Ángel" reached 32 on the Billboard Hot Latin Songs chart and La Voz de un Ángel managed to climb into the top 20 on the Billboard Hot Latin Albums chart, peaking at 16. In Mexico the song became the most successful song of 2005, leading the charts during 13 week.

==== Charts ====
Chart 2005	Position
US Billboard Hot Latin Songs	32

=== David Archuleta ===
"Angels"

Single by David Archuleta

from the album David Archuleta
- Released: 27 October 2008
- Recorded: 2008
- Genre: Pop
- Length: 3:33 (American Idol studio version); 4:09 (album version)
- Label: Jive
- Producer: Eric Rosse

David Archuleta singles chronology
"Crush" (2008)	"Angels" (2008)	"A Little Too Not Over You" (2009)

David Archuleta initially covered this song during the 7th season of American Idol, in 2008. A studio version of this cover was produced and made available for purchase as a digital download exclusively via iTunes Store for a limited period.

Later in that year, he decided to re-record the song, with a different arrangement and production, for his debut album. The version is also available for digital purchase since 27 October 2008, when it was released to help promote the pre-order of Archuleta's album.

==== Formats and track listings ====
Digital download

1. "Angels" (main version) — 4:09
2. "Angels" (promotional version) — 3:33

==== Chart performance ====
Archuleta's version of the song has become the second highest charting version in the United States after the original performed by Robbie Williams. It managed to enter the Billboard Hot 100 at No. 89 due to digital downloads. On the Canadian Hot 100 the song peaked at No. 64.

==== Charts ====
Chart (2008)	Peak position
Canadian Hot 100	64
US Billboard Hot 100	89

=== Blessing Chitapa ===
"Angels"

Single by Blessing Chitapa

from the album Count My Blessings
- Released: 14 November 2020
- Recorded: 2020
- Genre: Pop
- Length: 4:10
- Label: Universal Music on Demand

Blessing Chitapa singles chronology
"Angels" (2020)	"I Smile" (2021)

In November 2020, Blessing Chitapa, winner of the ninth series of The Voice UK, released a cover version of "Angels" as her winner's single. The song is included on Chitapa's 2021 debut album, Count My Blessings.

On 14 November 2020, Chitapa performed the song "Angels" live on The Voice UK grand final, with the single being released after the show was finished as a digital download.

==== Charts ====
Chart (2020)	Peak position
UK Singles Downloads (Official Charts)	50

==== Release history ====
Country	Release date	Format	Label
United Kingdom	14 November 2020	Digital download	Universal Music on Demand

=== Kindred Spirit ===
In June 2021, an artist collective named Kindred Spirit that included Glen Matlock, Steve Norman, Marcella Detroit, Earl Slick among others, released a cover version of the song titled "Angels (Of the Nations)" to both commemorate music producer Steve Brown who died in 2021 and raise money to offer angel sculptures as gifts to the families of UK doctors who died of COVID-19 while working for the British National Health Service.
