= VoiceMale =

All-male a cappella group from Massachusetts

- Origin: Brandeis University, Waltham, Massachusetts
- Genres: A cappella
- Years active: 1997–present

VoiceMale is a masculine-centered a cappella group based out of Brandeis University in Waltham, Massachusetts. Tracks from VoiceMale albums Propeller (2003), Ain't Done Overnight (2006), and Where's the Album? (2008) have appeared on the Best of Collegiate A Cappella (BOCA) compilation albums. In 2004, VoiceMale also received the award for Best All-Male Album of the Year from the Contemporary A Cappella Society (CASA) for their work on Propeller. Founded by Jonathan Berkowitz '97, Joshua Namias '97 and Samrat Chakrabarti '97.

Samrat Chakrabarti, went on to serve as a music director of Hyannis Sound, founder of Jyde, and member of Five O'Clock Shadow.

On March 15, 2008, VoiceMale sang at the WERS All A Cappella Live at the Majestic and took first place in a competition against the MIT Logarhythms and the UMass Amherst Doo-Wop Shop, winning the opportunity to open for world-renowned A Cappella group, Rockapella, at the Cutler Majestic Theater the next day.

== Discography ==
- Living in the Now (2026)
- Test Fest 30 (Live) - EP (2025)
- Breathless - Single (2019)
- Take Your Pick - EP (2014)
- Phoenix (2011)
- Suit Up. (2009)
- Where's The Album? - The EP (2008)
- Ain't Done Overnight (2006)
- Propeller (2003)
- VoiceMale (2001)
- Malestrom (1999)
- Flipside (1997)

== Awards ==
- Included on Voices Only 2012 compilation - "Mother We Just Can't Get Enough" (2012).
- "Best Scholastic Original Song" CARA, for "Phoenix" (2012).
- "Best Male Collegiate Solo" CARA - Adam Levine for "Phoenix" (2012).
- Nominated, "Best Male Collegiate Album" CARA, for "Phoenix" (2012).
- Nominated, "Best Male Collegiate Song" CARA, for "Phoenix" (2012).
- Included on Sing 8: Too Cubed compilation - "Phoenix" a VoiceMale original song (2012).
- Included on BOCA 2012 compilation - "Phoenix" a VoiceMale original song (2012).
- Included on Voices Only 2011 compilation - "Phoenix" a VoiceMale original song (2011).
- "Best Scholastic Original Song" CARA, for "Time (Bring It On)" (2010).
- Runner-up, "Best Male Collegiate Solo" CARA - Adam Levine for "Lately" (2010).
- Nominated, "Best Male Collegiate Album" CARA, for "Suit Up." (2010).
- Nominated, "Best Male Collegiate Song" CARA, for "Where's the Love" (2010).
- Included on Sing 6 compilation - "Time (Bring It On)" a VoiceMale original song (2010).
- Included on Voices Only compilation - "Please Don't Go," a VoiceMale original song (2009).
- Nominated, "Best Male Collegiate Solo" CARA - Adam Levine for "Lately" (2009).
- Nominated, "Best Male Collegiate Song" CARA, for "Where's the Love" (2009).
- Opening track of BOCA - "Where's the Love [Remix]" (2009).
- Champions, WERS All A Cappella Live at the Majestic (2008).
- Semi-finalists, International Championship of Collegiate A Cappella (2007).
- Nominated, "Best All-Male A Cappella Album of the Year," for "Ain't Done Overnight" (2007).
- Included on Sing 3 compilation - "Human Nature" (2006).
- Best All-Male A Cappella Album for "Propeller" (2004).
- 'Best Arrangement for "Caravan" (2004).
- Runner-up, "Best Male Collegiate Solo," for Aithan Shapira's solo on "Caravan" (2004).
- Semi-finalists, International Championship of Collegiate A Cappella (2003).
- Finalists, International Championship of Collegiate A Cappella (2001).
