= Radio (Robbie Williams song) =

2004 single by Robbie Williams

Single by Robbie Williams

from the album Greatest Hits
- B-side: "Northern Town"
- Released: 4 October 2004
- Genre: Electropop
- Length: 3:52
- Label: Chrysalis
- Songwriters: Stephen Duffy; Robbie Williams
- Producers: Robbie Williams; Stephen Duffy; Andy Strange

Robbie Williams singles chronology
"Sexed Up" (2003)	"Radio" (2004)	"Misunderstood" (2004)

Music video
- "Radio" on YouTube

"Radio" is a song by British pop singer Robbie Williams, co-written by Williams and Stephen Duffy. It was the first single from Williams' compilation album Greatest Hits, released in 2004. Williams wrote the song's distinctive synth-pop melody by attempting to play Harold Faltermeyer's "Axel F" on an electronic keyboard from memory. "Radio" is Williams's first solo outing without the involvement of long-time producer and co-writer Guy Chambers, and is particularly notable as Williams's last UK number-one for eight years, until 2012's "Candy".

== Chart performance ==
"Radio" became Robbie Williams' sixth number-one single on the UK Singles Chart, selling 41,734 copies during its first week. The song was Williams's last UK number-one for eight years until "Candy" took the top spot in November 2012. "Radio" also topped the Danish Singles Chart and reached the top 10 across Europe, peaking at number one on the Eurochart Hot 100. In Australia, the single charted at number 12, and after seven weeks on the charts, the single was certified gold.

== Track listings ==
UK CD1 and European CD single

1. "Radio"
2. "Radio" (Maloney mix)

UK CD2

1. "Radio"
2. "Northern Town"
3. "Radio" (Sam La More Jumpin' Radio mix)
4. Gallery and video clips

UK DVD single

1. "Radio" (video)
2. "1974" (audio)
3. "Radio" (Massey mix audio)
4. Gallery and video clips

Australian CD single

1. "Radio"
2. "Northern Town"
3. "Radio" (Sam La More Jumpin' Radio mix)

== Credits and personnel ==
Credits are taken from the Greatest Hits album booklet.

Studio

- Mastered at Metropolis Mastering (London, England)

Personnel

- Robbie Williams – writing, lead vocals, synthesiser
- Stephen Duffy – writing, guitars, synthesiser, drums production
- Gavyn Wright – string leader
- Claire Worrall – string arrangement
- Nick Littlemore – additional programming
- Andy Strange – production
- Bob Clearmountain – mixing
- Tony Cousins – mastering

== Charts ==
=== Weekly charts ===
Chart (2004)	Peak position
Australia (ARIA)	12
Austria (Ö3 Austria Top 40)	3
Belgium (Ultratop 50 Flanders)	28
Belgium (Ultratop 50 Wallonia)	33
CIS Airplay (TopHit)	14
Croatia (HRT)	3
Denmark (Tracklisten)	1
Europe (Eurochart Hot 100)	1
Europe (European Hit Radio)	6
Finland (Suomen virallinen lista)	16
France (SNEP)	48
Germany (GfK)	2
Greece (IFPI)	11
Hungary (Dance Top 40)	29
Hungary (Rádiós Top 40)	11
Hungary (Single Top 40)	8
Ireland (IRMA)	6
Italy (FIMI)	2
Italy (Musica e dischi)	5
Latvia (Latvijas Top 40)	18
Netherlands (Dutch Top 40)	9
Netherlands (Single Top 100)	9
Norway (VG-lista)	8
Romania (UPFR)	38
Russia Airplay (TopHit)	12
Scottish Singles Sales (Official Charts)	1
Spain (Promusicae)	4
Spain Airplay (Top 40 Radio)	3
Sweden (Sverigetopplistan)	22
Switzerland (Schweizer Hitparade)	14
UK Singles (Official Charts)	1
UK Airplay (Music Week)	4

=== Year-end charts ===
Chart (2004)	Position
Germany (Media Control GfK)	98
Hungary (Rádiós Top 40)	96
Russia Airplay (TopHit)	51
UK Singles (OCC)	60
UK Airplay (Music Week)	70

== Certifications ==
Region	Certification	Certified units/sales
Australia (ARIA)	Gold	35,000^{^}
^{^} Shipments figures based on certification alone.
