= Marco Moré =

- Born: Marco Antonio Moreno García; 1 September 1984 (age 41)
- Origin: Monterrey, Nuevo León, Mexico
- Genres: Latin pop, pop, pop rock
- Occupations: Singer, songwriter, actor
- Instrument: Vocals
- Years active: 2003–present
- Label: Sony BMG
- Website: LAIF My Space Official

Marco Antonio Moreno García (born 1 September 1988), better known as Marco Moré, is a Mexican singer, songwriter and actor.

== Professional career ==
=== Biography ===
Marco Moré was born on 1 September 1984 in Monterrey, Nuevo León.

At 14, he participated in his first musical title "Alrededor Del Mundo" (Around The World), which had local performances in his hometown Monterrey.

For three years he led the event "La Nueva Generación De Estrellas" (The New Generation of Stars) and participated as a voice actor for Disney in the animated series Recess.

In 2002, he auditioned for the Second Generation of the academy, which was one of the 16 selected. His first appearance on national television was on 8 December 2002 at the concert "El Relevo" where members of the First Generation of the academy sang a duet with members of the Second Generation, being this concert, the presentation of new academics.

Since 2003 he has given shows in major cities in Mexico, Central America and United States, he participated in the Telethon of Guatemala and also still preparing in acting and singing. In October 2005, he studied an intensive course of performance with Ms. Martha Zabaleta in Mexico City, in December 2005, he studied an intensive course for action on TV in London and in July 2006, served as a "Memo" in the theater play "Vaselina 2006" or Grease (musical) under the production of Julissa, with which he toured throughout Mexico.

For 2009 he began studying in Berklee College of Music (Boston, U.S.A.) and opened his High Performance Academy of musicals in Monterrey n.L. México.

In 2011 Marco Moré was signed as a songwriter for the Agency Westwood Entertainment, and in 2013 he start the "Sound and Pepper: Music Services for Visuals" project.

== Discography ==
=== Studio albums ===
- 2004: Por Ti
- 2008: "LAIF"

=== Compilation albums ===
- 2003: La Academia Segunda Generación (11 CD's)
- 2003: Homenaje a... Juan Gabriel
- 2003: Homenaje a... Grandes Intérpretes Españoles
- 2003: Homenaje a... Grandes Duetos
- 2006: Vaselina 2006
