= South of the Border (Robbie Williams song) =

1997 single by Robbie Williams

Single by Robbie Williams

from the album Life thru a Lens
- B-side: "Cheap Love Song"
- Released: 15 September 1997
- Studio: Matrix Maison Rouge (London, England)
- Length: 3:53 (album version); 3:40 (single version)
- Label: Chrysalis
- Songwriters: Robbie Williams; Guy Chambers
- Producers: Guy Chambers; Steve Power

Robbie Williams singles chronology
"Lazy Days" (1997)	"South of the Border" (1997)	"Angels" (1997)

Music video
- "South of the Border" on YouTube

"South of the Border" is a song by English recording artist Robbie Williams, released as the third single from his debut studio album, Life thru a Lens (1997). The song reached No. 14 on the UK Singles Chart, his only single to miss the top 10 until "Sin Sin Sin" in 2006. This was the only Life Thru a Lens single that did not appear on Williams' Greatest Hits album (2004).

== Background ==
According to his home page, at the last second, Williams changed his mind and made this his single. This explains why the video is uncohesive and mostly a performance shoot. Williams has stated that the song was inspired by Kate Moss, giving way to the opening line "I know a freaky young lady name of cocaine Katie" (the line is changed to "no shame Katie" on the single version). After a few relatively unknown songs parallel to Gary Barlow's career and "South of the Border" failing, many thought this was the end of Williams.

== Critical reception ==
A reviewer from Music Week rated the song three out of five, adding that "though fairly flat in its radio version, this single will only benefit from the superior house and garage mixes getting the play in clubs." The magazine's Martin Aston described it as "a touch of the funky Black Grapes and bluesy Ocean Colour Scene", "with lippy, declamatory vocals." Claudia Connell from News of the World felt that the song "is powerful and up-beat, in contrast to the more relaxed [previous single] Lazy Days. There are clear rap influences-Robbie's own favourite music-and a mean and moody edge to his vocals. Taken from the forthcoming album Life Thru' A Lens, Robbie has shown that, unlike some of his former Take That colleagues, he isn't afraid to develop and move on."

== Track listings ==
- UK CD1
1. "South of the Border" – 3:40
2. "Cheap Love Song" – 4:10
3. "South of the Border" (187 Lockdown's Borderline mix) – 6:11
4. "South of the Border" (Phil 'the Kick Drum' Dance + Matt Smith's Nosebag dub) – 8:31
- UK CD2
1. "South of the Border" – 3:40
2. "South of the Border" (Mother's Milkin' It mix) – 7:08
3. "South of the Border" (Phil' the Kick Drum' Dance + Matt Smith's Filthy Funk vocal remix) – 8:31
4. "South of the Border" (187 Lockdown's Southside dub) – 6:11
5. "South of the Border" (Shango + Danny Howells' the Unknown DJ's Meet Cocaine Katie mix) – 9:31
- UK cassette single
1. "South of the Border" – 3:40
2. "Cheap Love Song" – 4:10
- European CD single
1. "South of the Border" – 3:40
2. "South of the Border" (Mother's Milkin' It mix) – 7:08
- European maxi-CD single
1. "South of the Border" – 3:40
2. "South of the Border" (Mother's Milkin' It mix) – 7:08
3. "South of the Border" (187 Lockdown's Borderline mix) – 6:12
4. "Cheap Love Song" – 4:10

== Credits and personnel ==
Credits are taken from the Life thru a Lens album booklet.

Studios

- Recorded at Matrix Maison Rouge (London, England)
- Mixed at Battery Studios (London, England)

Personnel

- Robbie Williams – writing, vocals, backing vocals
- Guy Chambers – writing, guitar, keyboards, production, arrangement
- Gary Nuttall – backing vocals, guitar
- Fil Eisler – guitar, bass
- Mark Smith – bass, programming
- Chris Sharrock – drums
- Andy Duncan – percussion
- Mark Feltham – harmonica
- Steve Power – production, mixing, programming
- Jim Brumby – Battery Studios assistant
- Matt Hay – Matrix Maison Rouge assistant

== Charts ==
Chart (1997)	Peak position
Europe (Eurochart Hot 100)	74
Italy Airplay (Music & Media)	7
Scotland Singles (OCC)	11
UK Singles (OCC)	14
UK Airplay (Music Week)	44
