= It's Only Us =

1999 single by Robbie Williams

Single by Robbie Williams

from the album FIFA 2000: The Album and I've Been Expecting You (2002 re-release)
- A-side: "She's the One"
- B-side: "Coke & Tears"
- Released: 8 November 1999
- Length: 2:50 ("It's Only Us"); 4:18 ("She's the One")
- Label: Chrysalis
- Songwriters: Robbie Williams; Guy Chambers; Alex Leam
- Producers: Guy Chambers; Steve Power

Robbie Williams singles chronology
"Strong" (1999)	"She's the One" / "It's Only Us" (1999)	"Win Some Lose Some" (2000)

Music video
- "It's Only Us" on YouTube

"It's Only Us" is a song by English singer Robbie Williams, released as a double A-side with a cover of "She's the One" on 8 November 1999. Unlike "She's the One", "It's Only Us" was a brand new recording made for the FIFA 2000 soundtrack. As such, it did not originally appear on I've Been Expecting You but was eventually added to its 2002 reissue (replacing "Jesus in a Camper Van" due to copyright issues).

The song became Williams' second number-one single in the United Kingdom, spending one week at number one. "It's Only Us" is the theme song to the EA Sports release of FIFA 2000, something which Williams agreed to on the condition that his team, Port Vale F.C., was included in the game. The video features a computer-animated Williams as part of the Port Vale football team and flying through space. The official soundtrack to FIFA 2000, entitled FIFA 2000: The Album, was released in 1999 and "It's Only Us" was the "official single" from it. The music video for the song was included as an enhanced CD feature on the album.

== Chart performance ==
The double A-side single became Williams' second number-one solo single in the United Kingdom, selling over 600,000 copies being certified Platinum by the British Phonographic Industry. The single also entered the top three in New Zealand, Williams' second single to do so.

== Track listings ==
UK CD1

1. "It's Only Us" – 2:50
2. "She's the One" – 4:18
3. "Coke & Tears" – 4:24
4. "It's Only Us" (video)

UK CD2

1. "She's the One" – 4:18
2. "It's Only Us" – 2:50
3. "Millennium" (live at Slane Castle) – 4:40
4. "She's the One" (video)

UK cassette single

1. "She's the One" – 4:18
2. "It's Only Us" – 2:50
3. "Millennium" (live at Slane Castle) – 4:40

== Charts ==
All entries charted as "She's the One" / "It's Only Us".

=== Weekly charts ===
Chart (1999–2000)	Peak position
Europe (Eurochart Hot 100)	9
New Zealand (Recorded Music NZ)	3
Scotland Singles (OCC)	1
UK Singles (OCC)	1

=== Year-end charts ===
Chart (1999)	Position
UK Singles (OCC)	48

== Certifications ==
Region	Certification	Certified units/sales
United Kingdom (BPI)	Platinum	781,000
