= Millennium (song) =

1998 single by Robbie Williams

Single by Robbie Williams

from the album I've Been Expecting You
- B-side: "Love Cheat" (demo); "Rome Munich Rome" (demo); "Lazy Days"; "Angels" (live)
- Released: 7 September 1998
- Genre: Pop; orchestral pop
- Length: 4:07 (album version); 3:46 (radio edit)
- Label: Chrysalis
- Songwriters: Robbie Williams; Guy Chambers; Leslie Bricusse; John Barry
- Producers: Guy Chambers; Steve Power

Robbie Williams singles chronology
"Let Me Entertain You" (1998)	"Millennium" (1998)	"No Regrets" / "Antmusic" (1998)

Music video
- "Millennium" on YouTube

"Millennium" is a song by the English singer Robbie Williams, released as the first single from his second studio album, I've Been Expecting You, on 7 September 1998. The song interpolates "You Only Live Twice", the Nancy Sinatra theme from the 1967 James Bond film. "Millennium" was Williams's first solo single to top the UK singles chart and received extensive airplay in the United States and Canada, where it served as the lead single from Williams' 1999 compilation album The Ego Has Landed.

== Recording and composing ==
"Millennium" started being written in 1997. Robbie Williams and producer Guy Chambers were at Blah Street Studios in Hampshire, where Williams expressed the idea to do something based on James Bond. Chambers sampled "You Only Live Twice" by Nancy Sinatra from the 1967 Bond film of the same name, which featuring what he considered an "iconic intro" that "grabs you straight away". Williams wanted the addition of a hip-hop beat, which was achieved by speeding up the sample.

Chambers then created a simple bassline for the verses. When Williams' lyrics were mostly done, Chambers felt it lacked "an obvious title for the track", and suggested "Millennium" for being "both strong and topical". Chambers said in a retrospective review, "There was a lot of talk about the millennium back then, it's a bit like the 'Brexit' word now". Chambers asked for a "football chant", which only had a melody before Williams came up with "come and have a go if you think you're hard enough", a phrase used by Melanie C during the 1997 Brit Awards and directed at Liam Gallagher, whom Williams was also feuding with.

The whole writing process took about four hours. Chambers described "Millennium" as "the simplest song Robbie and I have ever written - only two chords. And it's written in D flat major, which is very unusual in pop music."

Once co-producer Steve Power heard the demo they found potential for a single given it showed a different sound from Williams' debut album Life thru a Lens. As Power explained: "It had the more programming-based feel that we wanted to introduce on the second album in order to get away from the guitar-based feel of the first album, and it already had the chorus hook, the Bond theme sample, on the demo version, which I remember mixing before last Christmas."

Trident Studios in London was used for the majority of the recordings, including drums, bass and samples for the backing track, and the backing vocals, which included three female session singers and male vocals by Williams' guitarist Gary Nuttall. Williams' vocals were done at Jacobs Studios in Surrey.

Williams suggested using a sample only accompanied by a hip-hop beat. Guy Chambers found a beat by speeding the sample up. The record label, Chrysalis Records, discovered that a new recording would cost only one tenth of the licensing fee required to sample "You Only Live Twice", so they asked for a new string section that still acted as a recognisable pastiche of the song. Nick Ingman arranged the orchestra, which according to Power "was in the wrong key for 'Millennium', although we did want it to sound like the original sample in the choruses and we did refer to John Barry's original score for that", and conducted a 26-piece string section, plus harp and four French horns, at Angel Recording Studios in Islington to the programmed backing track, with a guide vocal over the top.

Power said the song used most of the 48 tracks offered by the multitrack tape: "We had about six tracks of backing vocals, and nine tracks for the strings. Then there were the programmed tracks; and when you get into programming, you'll layer about four kick drums to tape! For speed, and to keep the creative flow going, we put them all down to separate tracks rather than spend time deciding which one we wanted loudest when recording. So we had a lot of independent outs from the programmed backing track onto separate multitrack channels, like the programmed percussion and sampled noises. Then there were the unused scratching tracks, and the live percussion - all in all, I think we filled maybe 36 or 38 tracks in total."

== Chart performance ==
The song became Williams' first number-one single in the United Kingdom, shipping over 400,000 copies and being certified platinum by the British Phonographic Industry (BPI). The song also became an international success; it managed to break into the Top 40 around the world. It also became Williams' first song to chart inside the US Billboard Hot 100 when it was released in 1999. While neither "Millennium" nor "Angels" (the song chosen as his second single in the United States) charted in the top 40 of the Hot 100, it did chart at number 20 on the Mainstream Top 40 chart.

== Music video ==
The tongue-in-cheek video for "Millennium", directed by Vaughan Arnell and edited by Jake Sebastian Wynne, features Williams parodying James Bond, complete with dinner jacket and references to Bond films like Thunderball and From Russia with Love. The video was filmed at Pinewood Studios, home to most Bond productions. During the video, Williams travels in an aeroplane and fails to fly a futuristic jet pack. He is also seen flirting with several 'Bond Girls' - including Lorraine Pascale - in an over-the-top manner and caricaturing the facial expressions of Sean Connery. He is seen in a boat, clearly a studio model, against an obviously projected background characteristic of 1960s Bond films. During the end of the video, Williams drives away in an economy car, a Bond Bug, instead of 007's Aston Martin DB5, which later drives past him while he is having car trouble. At the 1999 Brit Awards, "Millennium" won the award for British Video of the Year.

== Track listings ==
UK CD1

1. "Millennium" – 4:06
2. "Love Cheat" (demo version) – 3:46
3. "Rome Munich Rome" (demo version) – 3:05

UK CD2 and cassette single

1. "Millennium" – 4:06
2. "Lazy Days" (original version) – 4:29
3. "Angels" (live) – 5:38

European CD single

1. "Millennium" – 4:06
2. "Angels" (live) – 5:38

Australian and Japanese CD single

1. "Millennium" – 4:06
2. "Angels" (live) – 5:38
3. "Rome Munich Rome" (demo version) – 3:05
4. "Love Cheat" (demo version) – 3:46

== Credits and personnel ==
Credits are lifted from the I've Been Expecting You album booklet.

Studio

- Mastered at Metropolis Mastering (London, England)

Personnel

- Robbie Williams – writing, vocals
- Guy Chambers – writing, acoustic guitar, electric guitar, bass synth, keyboards, production, arrangement
- Leslie Bricusse – writing
- John Barry – writing
- Gary Nuttall – background vocals
- Claudia Fontaine – background vocals
- Beverley Skeete – background vocals
- Nicole Patterson – background vocals
- Chris Sharrock – drums
- Andy Duncan – percussion
- London Session Orchestra – orchestra
- Gavyn Wright – orchestra leader
- Nick Ingman – orchestral arrangement
- Steve Power – production, recording, mixing, programming
- Steve McNichol – programming
- Steve Price – orchestral engineering
- Tony Cousins – mastering

== Charts ==
=== Weekly charts ===
Chart (1998–1999)	Peak position
Australia (ARIA)	24
Austria (Ö3 Austria Top 40)	18
Belgium (Ultratop 50 Flanders)	18
Belgium (Ultratop 50 Wallonia)	20
Canada Top Singles (RPM)	9
Canada Airplay (Nielsen BDS)	14
Canada Adult Contemporary (RPM)	27
Estonia (Eesti Top 20)	7
Europe (Eurochart Hot 100)	7
Europe (European Hit Radio)	1
Finland (Suomen virallinen lista)	15
Finland Airplay (Radiosoittolista)	7
France (SNEP)	16
Germany (GfK)	41
Greece (IFPI Greece)	2
Hungary (Mahasz)	4
Iceland (Íslenski Listinn Topp 40)	13
Ireland (IRMA)	1
Italy (FIMI)	4
Italy Airplay (Music & Media)	3
Italy (Musica e dischi)	7
Latvia (Latvijas Top 40)	3
Netherlands (Dutch Top 40)	29
Netherlands (Single Top 100)	38
New Zealand (Recorded Music NZ)	3
Norway (VG-lista)	14
Scottish Singles Sales (Official Charts)	1
Spain (AFYVE)	2
Spain Airplay (Top 40 Radio)	5
Sweden (Sverigetopplistan)	12
Switzerland (Schweizer Hitparade)	18
UK Singles (Official Charts)	1
UK Airplay (Music Week)	1
US Billboard Hot 100	72
US Adult Pop Airplay (Billboard)	22
US Pop Airplay (Billboard)	20
US CHR/Pop Top 50 (Radio & Records)	18
US Hot AC (Radio & Records)	19

=== Year-end charts ===
Chart (1998)	Position
Belgium (Ultratop 50 Wallonia)	83
Europe (Eurochart Hot 100)	49
Europe (European Hit Radio)	13
Iceland (Íslenski Listinn Topp 40)	92
Latvia (Latvijas Top 50)	30
Sweden (Hitlistan)	96
Taiwan (Hito Radio)	97
UK Singles (OCC)	29
UK Airplay (Music Week)	12

Chart (1999)	Position
Canada Top Singles (RPM)	35
Canada Adult Contemporary (RPM)	59
UK Airplay (Music Week)	46
US Adult Top 40 (Billboard)	75
US Mainstream Top 40 (Billboard)	99
US Hot AC (Radio & Records)	72

== Certifications ==
Region	Certification	Certified units/sales
United Kingdom (BPI)	Platinum	598,000

== Release history ==
Region	Date	Format(s)	Label(s)	Ref(s).
United Kingdom	7 September 1998	CD; cassette	Chrysalis	
Japan	30 September 1998	CD	Chrysalis	
United States	6 April 1999	Top 40; modern AC; mainstream rock; modern rock radio	Capitol	
