= I've Been Expecting You =

Studio album by Robbie Williams
- Released: 26 October 1998
- Recorded: 1998
- Studios: Trident, Abbey Road, Bath Street, Wheeler End, Angel, Battery and Jacob, London
- Length: 76:02; 75:14 (2002 reissue replacement track)
- Label: Chrysalis
- Producers: Robert Williams (exec.); Guy Chambers; Steve Power

Robbie Williams chronology
Life thru a Lens (1997)	I've Been Expecting You (1998)	The Ego Has Landed (1999)

Singles from I've Been Expecting You
- 1. "Millennium" Released: 7 September 1998; 2. "No Regrets" Released: 30 November 1998; 3. "Strong" Released: 15 March 1999; 4. "She's the One / It's Only Us" Released: 8 November 1999; 5. "Win Some Lose Some" Released: 22 May 2000

I've Been Expecting You is the second studio album by the English singer Robbie Williams. It was released on 26 October 1998 through Chrysalis Records. The album spawned five singles, including lead single "Millennium", which became Williams' first UK number-one hit.

A critical and major commercial success, it debuted at number one on the UK Albums Chart, marking Williams' second consecutive chart-topper, and has been certified 10× Platinum.

== Critical reception ==
Professional ratings
Review scores
Source	Rating
AllMusic	4/5 stars
The Great Rock Discography	7/10
NME	8/10
The Virgin Encyclopedia of Nineties Music	4/5 stars

John Bush of AllMusic rated the album four stars out of five, and stated that the album is both a "studied" and "more mature, calculated album" than its predecessor Life Thru a Lens (1997) "from a pop star who's often gloried in being immature and spontaneous." He noted the album "may suffer from comparisons to its excellent predecessor, but it also finds Robbie Williams weathering the sophomore storm quite well." NME rated the album 8/10, saying "boy, what a record" and that Williams' "writing skills have improved enormously". The reviewer also noted the album's "impressive diversity" and concluded that "sure, Robbie's still more Michael Barrymore than Michael Stipe, and he'll never be 'cool' by that constipated, soul-crushingly snobbish James Lavelle definition. But he's a natural-born star and he wants you to love him. I've Been Expecting You provides 12 good reasons why you should."

Retrospectively, Colin Larkin of The Encyclopedia of Popular Music considered I've Been Expecting You to continue Williams' "renaissance" and highlighted "No Regrets" as "one of Williams' finest songs to date", as well as praising "Strong" for being "wonderfully self-deprecating." The Rough Guide to Rock contributor Jane Holly writes that the album received "great critical acclaim" and was "another eclectic mix of songs and styles", with the singer's "no-nonsense lyrics" evident on "Strong" and "No Regrets". She also praised how Williams "emanates a new-found confidence" throughout the album.

In 2011, I've Been Expecting You was ranked at number 223 in Q's readers poll of the "250 Best Albums of the Last 25 Years"; the magazine wrote that the record "dials down the cabaret to gratifying effect", and drew attention to its ubiquitous singles.

== Success ==
Williams and Chambers started the writing process of the album in Jamaica in the spring of 1998. I've Been Expecting You was released in October 1998. It debuted at number one on the UK Albums Chart, and went on to become the UK's best selling album for that year. According to the Music Week, the album has sold 2,582,016 copies in the UK as of November 2016, and has been certified 10× Platinum for shipments of 3 million copies, making it Williams' best-selling album in the country.

The album also received attention outside the United Kingdom, particularly in continental Europe and Latin America, and has sold a total of five million copies worldwide. Williams finished album promotion with an extensive European tour in the autumn of 1999. I've Been Expecting You was ranked 91st in a 2005 survey held by British television's Channel 4 to determine the 100 greatest albums of all time.

== Singles ==
- "Millennium", a song which was inspired by John Barry's music from the James Bond film You Only Live Twice, became Williams' first solo number-one single in the United Kingdom when it was released in September 1998, knocking All Saints from the top spot. Williams commented that "Someone had to be knocked off and it may as well be the wife" as Williams and Nicole Appleton were engaged at the time. The song went on to sell over 400,000 copies in the UK being certified Gold by the BPI in November 1998. The song also became a top twenty hit in many European countries as well as in Latin America and Australia.
- "No Regrets", a collaboration with Pet Shop Boys singer Neil Tennant and The Divine Comedy's Neil Hannon, was released as the album's second single in November 1998, reaching number four in the UK Singles Chart, backed with the cover of Adam and the Ants 1981 hit "Antmusic". The song became a substantial hit around the world and went on to sell over 200,000 copies in the United Kingdom, where it was certified Silver in October 2004, almost six years after its original release.
- "Strong", a song written in a hotel in Cologne, Germany, inspired by some of Williams' more manic admirers whom he admitted "scared the living daylights" out of him, was released as the album's third single. The song debuted at number four in the United Kingdom and number nine in New Zealand. The track became a hit, peaking within the top forty around Europe and many other countries around the world.
- "She's the One", a cover of the Karl Wallinger track from the album Egyptology, was a favourite song of Williams' after his time in rehab. The song was released as the album's fourth single, becoming his second number-one hit in the United Kingdom. The song went on to win a number of awards around the world, including a BRIT Award for 'Single of the Year' and a Capital Radio Award for 'Best Single'. The single was released as a double A-side with "It's Only Us", the official theme for EA Sports' video game FIFA 2000. The single sold over 400,000 copies in the UK alone and was certified Gold by the BPI in early 2000.
- "Win Some Lose Some" was released as the album's fifth and final single in May 2000 in New Zealand only. Even before its physical release, "Win Some Lose Some" reached the top 10 in New Zealand on airplay alone, peaking at number seven after the CD single was issued; it spent four weeks inside the top 10 and 21 weeks overall on the RIANZ Singles Chart, making it Williams' longest-charting New Zealand hit. The song was included on the New Zealand version of Williams' Greatest Hits album in 2004.

== Lawsuit ==
In 1998, Williams was sued by Ludlow Publishing over the song "Jesus in a Camper Van" because it lifted lyrics from the Loudon Wainwright III song "I Am the Way", from his album Attempted Mustache. The lyric to "I Am the Way" is as follows: "Every son of God has a little hard luck sometime, especially when he goes around saying he's the way." The lyric to "Jesus in a Camper Van" in question is: "Even the son of God gets it hard sometimes, especially when he goes around, saying I am the way."

Williams claimed that he had heard a young man say the line whilst in rehab, and only found that it was a line from Wainwright's song after he had already recorded it. Williams' agents called Wainwright to notify him about this, but Wainwright had little say in the matter; "I Am the Way" was a parody of the Woody Guthrie song "New York Town"; Ludlow Publishing owned the line's copyright. In 2002, Ludlow Publishing won the lawsuit, receiving 25% of the income that "Jesus in a Camper Van" garnered, and subsequently, the album was re-issued replacing "Jesus in a Camper Van" with "It's Only Us".

During a show at the Roundhouse London in October 2019, Williams performed the song and also revealed, "That lyric cost me £2.5 million! Truth to God!"

== Track listing ==
All tracks written by Robbie Williams and Guy Chambers, except where noted.

I've Been Expecting You – Standard edition
No.	Title	Writer(s)	Length
1.	"Strong"		4:39
2.	"No Regrets"		5:10
3.	"Millennium"	Williams; Chambers; Leslie Bricusse; John Barry	4:07
4.	"Phoenix from the Flames"		4:02
5.	"Win Some Lose Some"		4:18
6.	"Grace"		3:13
7.	"Jesus in a Camper Van"	Williams; Chambers; Loudon Wainwright III	3:39
8.	"Heaven from Here"		3:05
9.	"Karma Killer"		4:28
10.	"She's the One (World Party cover)"	Karl Wallinger	4:18
11.	"Man Machine"		3:35
12.	"These Dreams"		5:08
13.	"Stand Your Ground" (hidden track)		3:28
14.	"Stalker's Day Off (I've Been Hanging Around)" (hidden track)	Williams; Chambers; Fil Eisler	3:43

2002 Reissue
No.	Title	Length
7.	"It's Only Us"	2:50

== Credits ==
- Robbie Williams – vocals

Robbie Williams Band

- Guy Chambers – keyboards, organ, vibraphone, synthesizer, acoustic guitar, piano, electric guitar, orchestral samples, bass synth, musical director
- Fil Eisler – bass, guitar, vocals
- Gary Nuttall – guitar, vocals
- Alex Dickson – guitar, vocals
- Planet Claire (Claire Worrall) – guitar, vocals, keyboards
- Chris Sharrock – drums

=== Additional personnel ===
- Andy Duncan – percussion, loops
- DJ Slice – scratching
- Jeremy Stacey – drums
- Nicole Appleton – telephone voice

London Session Orchestra

- Gavin Wright – leader
- Nick Ingham – orchestral arranger

=== Backing vocalists ===
- Bevereley Skeet
- Claudia Fontaine
- Neil Hannon
- Neil Tennant
- Nicole Patterson

==== Also Acoustic guitarists ====
- Andre Barreau
- David Catlin-Birch – also bass guitar
- Steve McEwan – also electric guitar

== Charts ==
=== Weekly charts ===
Chart (1998–2005)	Peak position
Argentine Albums (CAPIF)	10
Austrian Albums (Ö3 Austria)	24
Belgian Albums (Ultratop Flanders)	11
Belgian Albums (Ultratop Wallonia)	32
Danish Albums (Hitlisten)	8
Dutch Albums (Album Top 100)	35
Estonian Albums (Eesti Top 10)	6
European Albums (Music & Media)	4
Finnish Albums (Suomen virallinen lista)	20
French Albums (SNEP)	31
German Albums (Offizielle Top 100)	16
Greek Albums (IFPI Greece)	6
Hungarian Albums (MAHASZ)	33
Icelandic Albums (Tónlist)	12
Irish Albums (IRMA)	1
Italian Albums (FIMI)	19
Italian Albums (Musica e dischi)	14
New Zealand Albums (RMNZ)	4
Norwegian Albums (VG-lista)	5
Scottish Albums (Official Charts)	1
Spanish Albums (PROMUSICAE)	42
Swedish Albums (Sverigetopplistan)	21
Swiss Albums (Schweizer Hitparade)	19
UK Albums (Official Charts)	1

Chart (2021)	Position
UK Vinyl Albums (OCC)	9

=== Year-end charts ===
Chart (1998)	Position
European Albums (Music & Media)	74
UK Albums (OCC)	5

Chart (1999)	Position
European Albums (Music & Media)	21
German Albums (Offizielle Top 100)	83
UK Albums (OCC)	6

Chart (2000)	Position
UK Albums (OCC)	61

Chart (2003)	Position
Belgian Albums (Ultratop Flanders)	70

=== Decade-end charts ===
Chart (1990–1999)	Position
UK Albums (OCC)	18

== Certifications and sales ==
Region	Certification	Certified units/sales
Denmark (IFPI Danmark)	Platinum	50,000^{^}
France (SNEP)	2× Gold	200,000^{*}
Germany (BVMI)	Gold	250,000^{^}
Netherlands (NVPI)	Gold	50,000^{^}
New Zealand (RMNZ)	Platinum	15,000^{^}
Norway (IFPI Norway)	Gold	25,000^{*}
Sweden (GLF)	Gold	40,000^{^}
Switzerland (IFPI Switzerland)	Platinum	50,000^{^}
United Kingdom (BPI)	10× Platinum	3,000,000^{^}
Summaries
Europe (IFPI)	4× Platinum	4,000,000^{*}
^{*} Sales figures based on certification alone.^{^} Shipments figures based on certification alone.

== See also ==
- List of best-selling albums in the United Kingdom
