= Let Me Entertain You (Robbie Williams song) =

1998 single by Robbie Williams

Single by Robbie Williams

from the album Life thru a Lens
- B-side: "The Full Monty Medley" (feat. Tom Jones); "I Wouldn't Normally Do This Kind of Thing"; "I Am the Res-Erection"
- Released: 16 March 1998
- Recorded: 1997
- Genre: Britpop; glam rock
- Length: 4:21
- Label: Chrysalis
- Songwriters: Robbie Williams; Guy Chambers
- Producers: Guy Chambers; Steve Power

Robbie Williams singles chronology
"Angels" (1997)	"Let Me Entertain You" (1998)	"Millennium" (1998)

Music video
- "Let Me Entertain You" on YouTube

"Let Me Entertain You" is a single by English singer-songwriter Robbie Williams, released by Chrysalis as the fifth and final single from his debut solo studio album, Life Thru a Lens (1997). It was written by Williams and Guy Chambers. In March 1998, the track peaked at No. 3 on the UK Singles Chart. It is certified gold for sales of over 400,000 copies.

== Background ==
Williams and Chambers were inspired to write a 'Who-esque' song after watching the Rolling Stones film Rock and Roll Circus together.

"When we started writing the demo, there was a furious jungle beat underneath it. It was so hardcore it got me very excited, and I still get excited listening to it now. It's not really heavy metal, it's more like camp rock opera!"

The lyrics are mostly innuendoes and double entendre, telling the story of a man trying to persuade someone to cheat on their boyfriend with him. Although the sex of this person is never mentioned, they are addressed mon cher, which means my dear only when referring to a male. In a 2010 interview, Williams was quoted as saying "An awful lot of gay pop stars pretend to be straight. I'm going to start a movement of straight pop stars pretending to be gay."

The 2004 track on the Greatest Hits album differs slightly from the original 1998 release. The song has been subtly remixed, and Williams' vocals during the instrumental have been removed entirely. This remix was also featured on the In and Out of Consciousness compilation album in 2010. The original track however, is still featured on Williams' official website and Vevo channel.

== Critical reception ==
Alan Jones from Music Week wrote, "The fifth and final single to be lifted from Robbie Williams' Life Thru A Lens album, 'Let Me Entertain You' is a fast and furious retro rocker with hints of both 'Pinball Wizard' and 'Sympathy for the Devil'. Almost a pastiche, it lacks the subtlety and wide appeal of 'Angels', and is likely to have a much shorter chart career, though a high debut is very likely."

== Music video ==
Directed by frequent collaborator Vaughan Arnell, the video features the Robbie Williams Band who are dressed as members of the band Kiss. Williams' makeup is very similar to Gene Simmons' on-stage persona, The Demon, while the outfit Williams wears is nearly identical to a stage costume worn by Simmons' bandmate Paul Stanley. In doing so, the video has been called a "stylistic appropriation" of Kiss and a spoof of 1970s rock in general, while displaying its own characteristics of camp and self-parody.

After Simmons filed a lawsuit against King Diamond for using the makeup design in the 1980s, Williams had concerns over Kiss taking legal action against "Let Me Entertain You", but felt the makeup was necessary to get into character. No legal action was taken.

== Live performances ==
"Let Me Entertain You" became Williams' concert opener for most of his shows throughout his career. He enjoys opening shows with high energy performances of the song "because of what happens to the audience... this is going to make you do this right at the beginning of the set." To date, Williams has given more than 300 live performances of the song.

In August 2003, Williams performed the song as the opening of his Live at Knebworth concerts which he performed at Knebworth Festival to a total of 375,000 people. The performance is recreated as a scene in the 2024 biopic film Better Man.

Williams performed the song for the Brit Awards' opening act in 1999, and as the opening act for the Diamond Jubilee Concert as part of Queen Elizabeth II's Diamond Jubilee celebrations in 2012.

He also performed the song at the Live 8 Concert at Hyde Park in 2005. In a BBC documentary about the event shown that Christmas, Richard Curtis described the performance as ecstatic, comparing Williams to "a man who hasn't had sex for two years [finally] coming." David Baddiel likened the set to Queen's iconic performance at Live Aid in 1985, and Williams himself commented that "the audience just went ballistic." When interviewed, members of the audience commented that Williams' performance was the first time of the night they could hear the audience singing at the back of the field.

As with many of Williams' live performances, he often improvises with the melody and changes the lyrics to suit the venue or event. One example of this was during the Progress Live tour in 2011 following his reconciliation with his former band Take That after 15 years apart. The lyric "You're my rock of empathy" was replaced with "Hello [venue] remember me?"

Williams rarely sings the chorus himself, often relying on the audience and backing vocalists to carry the song for him as he shouts words of encouragement for the audience. However, on the Swings Both Ways Arena Tour in 2014, Williams performed a jazz arrangement of the song, instead singing "Let me enter you" to individual members of the audience during the chorus.

A popular pop-rock anthem in most European countries, the song has been covered live by several artists, including Bon Jovi, Westlife and the cast of Duets. Five singers have performed the song on Syco's talent show The X Factor.

== Influence and reception ==
The song was found in a survey by Mind to be one of the top three songs for happiness. It has been called arguably one of the most well-known songs of the 1990s.

"Let Me Entertain You" is often played during news reports or interviews with Williams, and is frequently played to welcome him to the stage during chat shows and other personal appearances. It was also used as the title of a best-selling biography of Williams.

After his 2009 album Reality Killed the Video Star received mixed reviews, Williams joked he should have titled that album Let Me Underwhelm You.

The song has been covered by other artists, including VoiceMale, who inserted lyrics from Steppenwolf's "Magic Carpet Ride".

== Formats and track listings ==
These are the formats and track listings of major single releases of "Let Me Entertain You".

- UK CD1

(Released 16 March 1998)

1. "Let Me Entertain You" – 4:24
2. "The Full Monty Medley" featuring Tom Jones – 5:28
3. "I Wouldn't Normally Do This Kind of Thing" – 3:07
4. "I Am the Res-Erection" – 3:48
- UK CD2

(Released 16 March 1998)

1. "Let Me Entertain You" (full-length version) – 5:19
2. "Let Me Entertain You" (Stretch 'N' Vern's Rock 'N' Roll Mix) – 11:10
3. "Let Me Entertain You" (Amethyst's Dub) – 7:47
4. "Let Me Entertain You" (Robbie Loves His Mother Mix) – 7:49
5. "Let Me Entertain You" (The Bizzarro Mix) – 5:50
- Australian CD

(Released 18 March 1998)

1. "Let Me Entertain You" (LP version) – 4:22
2. "The Full Monty Medley" featuring Tom Jones – 5:28
3. "I Wouldn't Normally Do This Kind of Thing" – 3:08
4. "Back for Good" (live version) – 3:49
5. "Let Me Entertain You" (Amethyst's Dub) – 7:47

== Charts and certifications ==
=== Charts ===
Chart (1998)	Peak position
Australia (ARIA)	46
Belgium (Ultratip Bubbling Under Wallonia)	17
Europe (Eurochart Hot 100)	14
Europe (European Hit Radio)	17
Greece (IFPI Greece)	25
Hungary (Mahasz)	10
Iceland (Íslenski Listinn Topp 40)	16
Ireland (IRMA)	13
Latvia (Latvijas Top 40)	6
Netherlands (Single Top 100)	42
New Zealand (Recorded Music NZ)	33
UK Singles (Official Charts)	3
UK Airplay (Music Week)	3

=== Year-end charts ===
Chart (1998)	Position
Latvia (Latvijas Top 50)	49
UK Singles (OCC)	71
UK Airplay (Music Week)	14

=== Certifications ===
Region	Certification	Certified units/sales
Denmark (IFPI Danmark)	Gold	45,000^{‡}
New Zealand (RMNZ)	Platinum	30,000^{‡}
United Kingdom (BPI)	Platinum	645,000
^{‡} Sales+streaming figures based on certification alone.
