= Life thru a Lens =

Studio album by Robbie Williams
- Released: 29 September 1997
- Recorded: 1996–1997
- Studios: Battery, London; Maison Rouge, London
- Genres: Dance-pop; soft rock; pop rock; power pop
- Length: 52:46
- Label: Chrysalis
- Producers: Guy Chambers; Steve Power

Robbie Williams chronology
Life thru a Lens (1997)	I've Been Expecting You (1998)

Singles from Life thru a Lens
- 1. "Old Before I Die" Released: 14 April 1997; 2. "Lazy Days" Released: 14 July 1997; 3. "South of the Border" Released: 15 September 1997; 4. "Angels" Released: 1 December 1997; 5. "Let Me Entertain You" Released: 16 March 1998

Life thru a Lens is the debut solo album by English singer-songwriter Robbie Williams following his departure from Take That. Released on 29 September 1997 through Chrysalis Records, the album is influenced by Britpop, a departure from the poppier tone of the music Take That employed. The album's working name was The Show-Off Must Go On.

The album's first three singles, "Old Before I Die", "Lazy Days" and "South of the Border", were all moderate successes, but it was the fourth single "Angels" which catapulted Williams to international fame as a solo artist. Peaking at number four, it has sold over one million copies in the UK and is his best-selling single to date. The fifth and final single "Let Me Entertain You" reached number three. "Freedom", Williams' first solo single, a cover of George Michael's 1990 hit, is not featured on the album.

Life thru a Lens debuted at number 11 on the UK Albums Chart and initially remained in the lower regions, but, upon the chart success of "Angels", it began steadily climbing and finally reached number one in April 1998, five months after its release. Though never selling more than 60,000 copies in a single week, the album sold over 2,094,000 copies by November 2013, making it Williams' fourth-best-selling studio album and fifth-best-seller when considering Greatest Hits (2004).

The album cover art, a photograph of Williams at the centre of a crowd of photographers, was created by Andy Earl. In 2024, the cover was altered to a chimpanzee depiction of Williams for the theatrical poster of his biopic, Better Man.

== Recording and music ==
After trying hard to find his own sound during a period of personal upheaval, Williams began recordings for the album at London's Maison Rouge studios in March 1997, shortly after his introduction to Guy Chambers. The title track, "Life thru a Lens", was written about his then-girlfriend Jacqueline Hamilton-Smith, who was a socialite. It is often mistakenly attributed to Tara Palmer-Tompkinson, but they did not date until 2006. "Ego a Go Go" was written about Gary Barlow, "South of the Border" discusses Kate Moss, and "Baby Girl Window" was inspired by Samantha Beckinsale and her late father, actor Richard Beckinsale. "One of God's Better People" and "Angels" were inspired by Williams' mother, Jan. Hidden track "Hello, Sir" is a poem that takes a dig at one of Williams' former teachers. Williams reprised part of the poem on the 1 Giant Leap song "My Culture".

John Bush of AllMusic wrote that Life thru a Lens "continually betrays overt influences from Oasis and other Britpop stars", a direction his former Take That bandmate Mark Owen had also chosen to pursue on his first solo album Green Man (1996). The album's music has also been characterised as power pop.

== Critical reception ==
Professional ratings
Review scores
Source	Rating
AllMusic	4.5/5 stars
The Great Rock Discography	7/10
The Guardian	3/5 stars
Music Week	5/5 stars
NME	7/10
Paste	7.0/10
Smash Hits	4/5 stars
The Virgin Encyclopedia of Nineties Music	4/5 stars

Writing for Melody Maker in October 1997, Robin Bresnark gave Life thru a Lens a negative review, writing: "There's nothing here... sure, Robbie Williams is as fascinating a hapless goon as we're ever likely to come across. But this album feels more like a press release than an album – and that's not what I call music." In a retrospective review, John Bush of AllMusic was very positive, giving it four and a half stars out of five. He called it "one of the best U.K. debuts of the '90s" and "an uninhibited joyride through all manner of British music, from glam to alternative to soft-rock to dance-pop" which "triumphs" due to "gorgeous production, Williams' irresistible personality, and the overall flavor of outrageous, utterly enjoyable pop music". He concluded it was "excellent". Robert Dimery included the album in the book 1001 Albums You Must Hear Before You Die.

Martin C. Strong, writing in The Great Rock Discography, reflected that the general critical consensus on Life Thru a Lens was "that Williams was having the last laugh, beating his former Take That cronies hands down (both Gary Barlow and Mark Owen were taking the solo road with middling success) and winning over a cross section of musical palates with his irrepressible style." Colin Larkin of The Encyclopedia of Popular Music considered it an "excellent" album that eclipsed Barlow's album Open Road, "both musically and critically". Commenting on the album's music and it topping the UK charts 28 weeks after its initial release, Larkin wrote: "Never before had so many pundits and critics been proved so wrong." Rough Guides contributor Jane Holly wrote that Life Thru a Lens showed "a wide mix of styles", from ballads to rockers.

In 2016, Tom Eames of Digital Spy ranked it as Williams' fourth best album, writing that "his partnership with Guy Chambers simply clicked" and although it "might sound dated today, the majority of the album is pure pop/rock joy".

== Commercial performance ==
Life thru a Lens was released in October 1997, not long after Williams's stint in rehab. It was launched with his first live solo gig at the Élysée Montmartre in Paris. At first, the album was slow to take off, debuting at #11 on the UK Albums Chart, and falling to 104 not long after release, having sold a little over 30,000 copies. It reached the number one position after spending 27 weeks on the chart, as a consequence of the enormous success of the "Angels" single, boosting the album's sales to 300,000. The album spent a total of 218 weeks on the chart and two weeks at #1, becoming the 58th best-selling album of all time in the UK with sales of 2.4 million copies. The album failed to make a bigger impact in the international market, but reached the top 10 in Argentina in early 1998. Life thru a Lens has sold more than 4 million copies worldwide and is certified eight-times platinum in the UK.

== Singles ==
- "Old Before I Die", a track co-written by Williams, Eric Bazilian, and Desmond Child, was released as the album's lead single in April 1997, peaking at #2 on the UK singles chart. The song failed to make an impact on other international charts.
- "Lazy Days" was released as the album's second single in the summer of 1997, amidst Williams' battle with addiction. He was allowed to check out of rehab to shoot the video for the song. The single charted at #8 in the UK, but, due to nonexistent promotion, it struggled to reach the top 40 of any other European chart.
- "South of the Border" was released as the album's third single in September 1997. It failed to make a significant impact on the UK singles chart, peaking at #14, and as such, many saw this as the end of Williams' solo career.
- "Angels", a song penned by Williams and Guy Chambers, was released as the album's fourth single. The decision to release the song came after Williams met with the record company to discuss concerns about his future. The single was released in December 1997, soon becoming Williams' best selling-single in the UK, being certified 2× Platinum by the BPI. The song became a hit around Europe and Latin America and sold almost two million copies worldwide, rocketing sales of his album.
- "Let Me Entertain You" was released as the album's fifth and final single in March 1998. It peaked at #3 on the UK singles chart, becoming one of Williams' signature songs and being the opening song for most of Williams' concerts throughout his career.

== Track listing ==
Life Thru a Lens – Standard edition
No.	Title	Writer(s)	Length
1.	"Lazy Days"	Robbie Williams; Guy Chambers	3:54
2.	"Life thru a Lens"	Williams; Chambers	3:07
3.	"Ego a Go Go"	Williams; Chambers	3:34
4.	"Angels"	Williams; Chambers	4:25
5.	"South of the Border"	Williams; Chambers	3:53
6.	"Old Before I Die"	Williams; Desmond Child; Eric Bazilian	3:53
7.	"One of God's Better People"	Williams; Chambers	3:33
8.	"Let Me Entertain You"	Williams; Chambers	4:22
9.	"Killing Me"	Williams; Chambers	3:56
10.	"Clean"	Williams; Antony Genn; Martin Slattery; Richard Hawley	3:55
11.	"Baby Girl Window"	Williams; Chambers	3:18
12.	"Hello Sir" (hidden track (Note: "Hello Sir" is a hidden track on the original compact disc version of the album. It is a spoken word lyric poem addressed to a former schoolteacher.))	Williams	1:27
Total length:			52:46

Life Thru a Lens – Japanese edition bonus tracks
No.	Title	Writer(s)	Length
13.	"Teenage Millionaire"	Williams; Chambers	3:11
14.	"She Makes Me High"	Williams; Chambers; Gary Nuttall	3:23
15.	"Hello Sir" (hidden track)	Williams	1:27
16.	"Ev'ry Time We Say Goodbye" (hidden track)	Cole Porter	3:03
Total length:			56:57

Life Thru a Lens – RW 25th Anniversary bonus DVD
No.	Title	Length
1.	"Old Before I Die" (live on TOTP)
2.	"Lazy Days" (live on TOTP)
3.	"South of the Border" (live on TOTP)
4.	"Angels" (live on TOTP)
5.	"Angels" (unplugged – live on TOTP)
6.	"The Full Monty Medley" (with Tom Jones; live at the Brit Awards)
7.	"Michael Parkinson Interview"
8.	"Let Me Entertain You" (live on TOTP)
9.	"Killing Me" (live on TOTP)

CD2 - Life On The Flipside; B-Sides and Bonus Tracks – RW 25th Anniversary
No.	Title	Writer(s)	Length
1.	"Freedom! '90 (George Michael cover)"	George Michael	5:52
2.	"Better Days"	Williams; Chambers	3:30
3.	"Average B Side"	Williams; Kevin King	2:58
4.	"Making Plans for Nigel"	Colin Moulding	4:04
5.	"Kooks"	David Bowie	2:33
6.	"Teenage Millionaire"	Williams; Chambers	3:10
7.	"Falling in Bed (Again)"	Williams; Matt Hay	3:29
8.	"She Makes Me High"	Williams; Chambers; Nuttall	3:23
9.	"Ev'ry Time We Say Goodbye"	Porter	3:03
10.	"Lazy Days" (original version)	Williams; Chambers	4:30
11.	"Cheap Love Song"	Williams; Chris Abbott; Owen Morris	4:10
12.	"Walk This Sleigh"	Williams; Chambers	2:58
13.	"Karaoke Overkill"	Williams; Chambers	3:29
14.	"Get the Joke"	Williams; Nuttall	3:03
15.	"Angels" (acoustic)	Williams; Chambers	4:27
16.	"Angeles" (Spanish version)	Williams; Chambers	4:28
17.	"Let Me Entertain You" (full length version)	Williams; Chambers	5:18
18.	"The Full Monty Medley" (with Tom Jones; live at the Brit Awards)		5:28
19.	"I Wouldn't Normally Do This Kind of Thing"	Neil Tennant; Chris Lowe	3:08
20.	"I Am the (Res)Erection"	Williams; Chambers	3:49
Total length:			77:00

CD3 – Work in Progress: The Making of Life Thru a Lens – RW 25th Anniversary
No.	Title	Length
1.	"Freedom" (Ambient Mix)	5:34
2.	"Freedom" (New Sound Dub)	11:14
3.	"Hey Little Girl" (Axis Studios demo, October/November 1996)	4:04
4.	"Clean" (Axis Studios demo, October/November 1996)	4:12
5.	"Old Before I Die" (Crescent Moon Studios demo, October 1996)	4:03
6.	"Lazy Days" (Tower Studios demo, January 1997)	3:54
7.	"Angels" (Tower Studios demo, January 1997)	4:19
8.	"Red Lights" (Tower Studios demo, January 1997)	2:58
9.	"Average B Side" (Westside Studios demo, February 1997)	3:00
10.	"Teenage Millionaire" (Rehearsal Recordings, Spring 1997)	2:24
11.	"South of the Border" (Rehearsal Recordings, Spring 1997)	4:03
12.	"Killing Me" (Rehearsal Recordings, Spring 1997)	3:56
13.	"Life Thru a Lens" (Rehearsal Recordings, Spring 1997)	3:15
14.	"South of the Border" (Mother's Milkin' It Mix)	7:09
15.	"Let Me Entertain You" (The Bizarro Mix)	5:54
Total length:		70:07

CD4 – Life on the Stage – RW 25th Anniversary
No.	Title	Length
1.	"Let Me Entertain You" (live at the Forum, London, UK/1998)	7:24
2.	"I Wouldn't Normally Do This Kind Of Things" (live at the Forum, London, UK/1998)	3:14
3.	"Clean" (live at the Forum, London, UK/1998)	3:47
4.	"South of the Border" (live at the Forum, London, UK/1998)	4:06
5.	"Average B Side" (live at the Forum, London, UK/1998)	3:21
6.	"Baby Girl Window" (live at the Forum, London, UK/1998)	3:37
7.	"One of God's Better People" (live at the Forum, London, UK/1998)	3:13
8.	"There She Goes" (live at the Forum, London, UK/1998)	2:56
9.	"Killing Me" (live at the Forum, London, UK/1998)	4:06
10.	"Life thru a Lens" (live at the Forum, London, UK/1998)	4:07
11.	"Teenage Millionaire" (live at the Forum, London, UK/1998)	3:51
12.	"Lazy Days" (live at the Forum, London, UK/1998)	6:22
13.	"Ego a Go Go" (live at the Forum, London, UK/1998)	4:41
14.	"Old Before I Die" (live at the Forum, London, UK/1998)	4:51
15.	"Angels" (live at the Forum, London, UK/1998)	4:51
16.	"Back for Good" (live at the Forum, London, UK/1998)	4:09
Total length:		68:46

== Personnel ==
- Robbie Williams – vocals, backing vocals
- Guy Chambers – keyboards, guitar, backing vocals
- Chris Sharrock – drums, snare
- Andy Duncan – percussion
- Martin Slattery – keyboards
- Mark Feltham – harmonica
- Gary Nuttall – guitar, backing vocals
- Andre Barreau – guitar, backing vocals
- Steve Power – keyboards, programming
- Geoff Dugmore – drums, percussion
- Steve Bush – programming
- Derek Watkins – trumpet
- Fil Eisler – guitar, bass guitar, tom-tom
- Mark Smith – bass guitar, programming
- Oscar O'Loughlin – guitar
- Mark Smith – guitar, programming
- Steve Sidwell – trumpet
- Chester Kamen – guitar
- Steve “Smiley” Barnard – drums, backing vocals
- David Catlin-Birch – bass guitar, backing vocals
- Kerry Hopwood – programming
- André Barreau – guitar, backing vocals
- Beverley Skeete – backing vocals
- Carroll Thompson – backing vocals
- Andy Caine – backing vocals
- Claudia Fontaine – backing vocals
- Nicole Patterson – backing vocals

== Charts ==
=== Weekly charts ===
Weekly chart performance for Life thru a Lens
Chart (1997–2021)	Peak position
Argentine Albums (CAPIF)	9
Australian Albums (ARIA)	34
Austrian Albums (Ö3 Austria)	33
Belgian Albums (Ultratop Flanders)	13
Dutch Albums (Album Top 100)	59
European Albums Chart	14
Finnish Albums (Suomen virallinen lista)	2*
French Albums (SNEP)	34
German Albums (Offizielle Top 100)	42
Greek Albums (IFPI Greece)	14
Irish Albums (IRMA)	6
New Zealand Albums (RMNZ)	34
Spanish Albums (PROMUSICAE)	37
Swiss Albums (Schweizer Hitparade)	39
UK Albums (Official Charts)	1
UK Vinyl Albums (OCC)	10

=== Year-end charts ===
1997 year-end chart performance for Life thru a Lens
Chart (1997)	Position
UK Albums (OCC)	96

1998 year-end chart performance for Life thru a Lens
Chart (1998)	Position
European Albums (Music & Media)	26
UK Albums (OCC)	4

1999 year-end chart performance for Life thru a Lens
Chart (1999)	Position
UK Albums (OCC)	33

== Certifications ==
Certifications and sales for Life thru a Lens
Region	Certification	Certified units/sales
Australia (ARIA)	Gold	35,000^{^}
Belgium (BRMA)	Gold	25,000^{*}
Denmark (IFPI Danmark)	Gold	25,000^{^}
Germany (BVMI)	Gold	250,000^{‡}
Ireland (IRMA)	4× Platinum	60,000^{^}
Netherlands (NVPI)	Gold	50,000^{^}
New Zealand (RMNZ)	2× Platinum	30,000^{^}
Spain (Promusicae)	Gold	50,000^{^}
Switzerland (IFPI Switzerland)	Gold	25,000^{^}
United Kingdom (BPI)	8× Platinum	2,400,000^{^}
Summaries
Europe (IFPI)	3× Platinum	3,000,000^{*}
^{*} Sales figures based on certification alone.^{^} Shipments figures based on certification alone.^{‡} Sales+streaming figures based on certification alone.
