= Lazy Days =

1997 single by Robbie Williams

Single by Robbie Williams

from the album Life thru a Lens
- B-side: "Teenage Millionaire"; "Falling in Bed (Again)"; "She Makes Me High"; "Ev'ry Time We Say Goodbye"
- Released: 14 July 1997
- Studio: Matrix Maison Rouge (London, England)
- Genre: Pop
- Length: 3:53
- Label: Chrysalis
- Songwriters: Robbie Williams; Guy Chambers
- Producers: Guy Chambers; Steve Power

Robbie Williams singles chronology
"Old Before I Die" (1997)	"Lazy Days" (1997)	"South of the Border" (1997)

Music video
- "Lazy Days" on YouTube

"Lazy Days" is a song by English singer-songwriter Robbie Williams. It was released in the United Kingdom on 14 July 1997 as the second single from his debut studio album, Life thru a Lens (1997). According to Williams, the song is about being young, optimistic about the future and not afraid of committing mistakes. The song became a top-10 hit in the United Kingdom, peaking at number eight on the UK Singles Chart. A demo version of "Lazy Days" is included as a B-side on the "Millennium" CD2 single.

== Critical reception ==
A reviewer from Music Week rated the song three out of five, adding, "Gary's former colleague continues to occupy indie-pop territory with a solid enough song. However, it lacks the killer chorus needed to better his previous chart performances." The magazine's Martin Aston described "Lazy Days" as "a hazy-lazy, summery feel, and an instant indication of Williams and [Guy] Chambers' Beatlesy tastes." David Sinclair from The Times viewed it as a "big, catchy, anthemic follow-up to Old Before I Die with fade-out borrowed from Hey Jude."

== Music video ==
Williams took a day out of rehab to shoot the accompanying music video for the song, and he explained it was "a bonkers video, 'cause that's how my head was at the time, I think". Williams explained that "Lazy Days" was a song previously written by Guy Chambers, during his spell in the Britpop band the Lemon Trees. Williams thought it was an amazing song, but made some changes to the lyrics, hooks, and arrangement.

== Track listings ==
- UK CD1 and cassette single
1. "Lazy Days" – 3:53
2. "Teenage Millionaire" – 3:09
3. "Falling in Bed (Again)" – 3:28
- UK CD2
1. "Lazy Days" – 3:53
2. "She Makes Me High" – 3:23
3. "Ev'ry Time We Say Goodbye" – 3:03
- European maxi-CD single
1. "Lazy Days" – 3:53
2. "She Makes Me High" – 3:23
3. "Teenage Millionaire" – 3:09
4. "Falling in Bed (Again)" – 3:28
5. "Ev'ry Time We Say Goodbye" – 3:03

== Credits and personnel ==
Credits are taken from the Life thru a Lens album booklet.

Studios

- Recorded at Matrix Maison Rouge (London, England)
- Mixed at Battery Studios (London, England)

Personnel

- Robbie Williams – writing, vocals, backing vocals
- Guy Chambers – writing, guitar, keyboards, production, arrangement
- Andre Barreau – backing vocals, guitar
- Steve McEwan – backing vocals, guitar
- Andy Caine – backing vocals
- Fil Eisler – bass
- Steve Power – keyboards, production, mixing
- Geoff Dugmore – drums
- Andy Duncan – percussion
- Jim Brumby – Battery Studios assistant
- Matt Hay – Matrix Maison Rouge assistant

== Charts ==
Chart (1997)	Peak position
Estonia (Eesti Top 20)	7
Europe (Eurochart Hot 100)	47
Europe (European Hit Radio)	27
Finland (Suomen virallinen lista)	18
Germany (GfK)	90
Greece (IFPI Greece)	11
Israel (IBA)	28
Italy (FIMI)	7
Netherlands (Single Top 100)	72
Scottish Singles Sales (Official Charts)	7
UK Singles (Official Charts)	8
UK Airplay (Music Week)	8
