= Old Before I Die =

1997 single by Robbie Williams

Single by Robbie Williams

from the album Life thru a Lens
- B-side: "Better Days"; "Average B Side"; "Making Plans for Nigel"; "Kooks"
- Released: 14 April 1997
- Studio: Matrix Maison Rouge (London, England)
- Genre: Rock
- Length: 3:50
- Label: Chrysalis
- Songwriters: Robbie Williams; Desmond Child; Eric Bazilian
- Producers: Guy Chambers; Steve Power

Robbie Williams singles chronology
"Freedom" (1996)	"Old Before I Die" (1997)	"Lazy Days" (1997)

Music video
- "Old Before I Die" on YouTube

"Old Before I Die" is a song by English singer-songwriter Robbie Williams, released as the first single from his debut album, Life thru a Lens (1997). The Oasis-influenced song became a number-two hit in the United Kingdom and a number-one hit in Spain following its release on 14 April 1997. Williams wrote the song along with Desmond Child and Eric Bazilian, with production by Guy Chambers and Steve Power.

== Critical reception ==
Pan-European magazine Music & Media commented, "Williams certainly can't be accused of playing it safe in the wake of his departure from U.K popsters Take That. Instead, post-'Freedom', he's opted for a radical change of musical direction. Gone is the sweet, middle of the road style, in favour of a solid and confident rock sound, somewhat reminiscent of his new pals, Oasis." A reviewer from Music Week rated the song four out of five, describing it as "a confidently composed return from the former Take That man, boasting a strong vocal, tuneful Beatlesesque melody and a ILR-friendly hook. On this evidence, Owen, Barlow and co may be left in Williams shadow." The magazine's Martin Aston complimented it as "pure Britpop/Beatles swagger and crunch." Ian Hyland from Sunday Mirror noted that the singer "has come up with some magic tracks", adding that songs like this are "stadium thrillers".

== Music video ==
A music video was made to accompany the song. It features Robbie Williams performing for the camera with ageing rock stars as his backing band, and some fade-ins by the cameraman. There are also shots of Williams flying through the air.

== Track listings ==
- UK CD1
1. "Old Before I Die"
2. "Better Days"
3. "Average B Side"
- UK CD2
1. "Old Before I Die"
2. "Making Plans for Nigel"
3. "Kooks"
- UK cassette single
1. "Old Before I Die"
2. "Making Plans for Nigel"
3. "Better Days"
- European CD single
1. "Old Before I Die"
2. "Average B Side"
- Australian CD single
1. "Old Before I Die"
2. "Kooks"
3. "Average B Side"
4. "Making Plans for Nigel"
5. "Better Days"
- Japanese mini-album
1. "Old Before I Die"
2. "Kooks"
3. "Average B Side"
4. "Making Plans for Nigel"
5. "Better Days"
6. "Freedom"

== Credits and personnel ==
Credits are taken from the Life thru a Lens album booklet.

Studios

- Recorded at Matrix Maison Rouge (London, England)
- Mixed at Battery Studios (London, England)

Personnel

- Robbie Williams – writing, vocals, backing vocals
- Desmond Child – writing
- Eric Bazilian – writing
- Steve McEwan – backing vocals, guitar
- Guy Chambers – guitar, keyboards, production, arrangement
- Fil Eisler – guitar, bass
- Steve Power – keyboards, production, mixing
- Geoff Dugmore – drums, percussion
- Jim Brumby – Battery Studios assistant
- Matt Hay – Matrix Maison Rouge assistant

== Charts ==
=== Weekly charts ===
Chart (1997)	Peak position
Australia (ARIA)	56
Austria (Ö3 Austria Top 40)	30
Belgium (Ultratop 50 Flanders)	47
Estonia (Eesti Top 20)	9
Europe (Eurochart Hot 100)	15
Europe (European Hit Radio)	6
Germany (GfK)	37
Greece (IFPI Greece)	2
Hungary (Mahasz)	2
Iceland (Íslenski Listinn Topp 40)	23
Ireland (IRMA)	11
Israel (IBA)	7
Italy (FIMI)	2
Italy (Musica e dischi)	23
Italy Airplay (Music & Media)	3
Latvia (Latvijas Top 40)	18
Netherlands (Dutch Top 40)	32
Netherlands (Single Top 100)	53
Scottish Singles Sales (Official Charts)	1
Spain (AFYVE)	1
Spain Airplay (Top 40 Radio)	18
Switzerland (Schweizer Hitparade)	33
UK Singles (Official Charts)	2
UK Airplay (Music Week)	2

=== Year-end charts ===
Chart (1997)	Position
UK Singles (OCC)	79
UK Airplay (Music Week)	32

== Certifications ==
Region	Certification	Certified units/sales
United Kingdom (BPI)	Silver	200,000^{‡}
^{‡} Sales+streaming figures based on certification alone.

== Release history ==
Region	Date	Format(s)	Label(s)	Ref.
United Kingdom	14 April 1997	CD; cassette	Chrysalis	
Japan	21 May 1997	CD	Chrysalis	
