= In and Out of Consciousness: Greatest Hits 1990–2010 =

Greatest hits album by Robbie Williams
- Released: 8 October 2010
- Recorded: 1993 – June 2010
- Length: 155:51
- Label: Virgin
- Producers: Robbie Williams, Trevor Horn, Guy Chambers, Steve Power, Pet Shop Boys, Mark Ronson, Soul Mekanik, Gary Barlow, Stephen Duffy, Stephen Hague

Robbie Williams chronology
| Reality Killed the Video Star (2009) | In and Out of Consciousness: Greatest Hits 1990–2010 (2010) | Take the Crown (2012) |

Singles from In and Out of Consciousness: Greatest Hits 1990–2010
- 1. "Shame" Released: 27 August 2010

In and Out of Consciousness: Greatest Hits 1990–2010 is the second greatest hits compilation album by the English singer-songwriter Robbie Williams, after his first greatest hits compilation, Greatest Hits, which was released in 2004. The album, which features 39 songs, was released in October 2010 and is his last album under his recording contract with EMI. The lead single of the album is "Shame", co-written by and featuring fellow Take That member Gary Barlow. The song is their first collaboration in 15 years since Williams left Take That in 1995.

The album debuted at number one on the UK Albums Chart, making it Williams' ninth album to debut at number one and his first since Rudebox released in 2006. It has been certified Platinum, selling over 41,000 copies on its first day of release and 120,000 copies during its first week, making the album the second-fastest selling of the year in the UK. The album topped the charts in Austria and Germany, and charted within the top five of the charts in Ireland, Italy, the Netherlands, Portugal, Spain and Switzerland.

== Background information and production ==
Speaking about the album and working with Barlow again, Williams said: "It’s incredible to listen to the album and realise that it’s already been 20 years of making music and playing gigs. And the great thing about the album is that it’s not only a celebration of my past but also a bridge to the future. The fact that part of the future includes a name from my past makes it all the more poignant for me".

Beside the lead single, "Shame", the album also features a new track called "Heart and I" co-written with Barlow. The track listing and cover art of the album were revealed on 13 July 2010 on Williams' official website. The image for the cover was captured by photographer Julian Broad, who also worked with Williams for the Reality Killed the Video Star album cover. The cover was shot in May 2010 in Malibu, California.

== Promotion ==
Williams and Barlow performed "Shame" on 12 September 2010 at the Help for Heroes held at the Twickenham Stadium. They also performed the single on Strictly Come Dancing on 2 October 2010. On 8 October 2010 they gave an interview and performed on Paul O'Grady Live. On 7 October 2010 Barlow and Williams performed "Shame" and "Shine" on the BBC Radio 1 Live Lounge. On the release date of the album in the UK, Williams gave an interview on Daybreak as well as performing "Feel" and "Shame".

== Singles ==
The only single to be released is "Shame", a duet co-written with fellow Take That member Gary Barlow. The video and the song premiered on 26 August 2010. Directed by Vaughan Arnell, the video is a spoof of the film Brokeback Mountain. Tim Jonze from The Guardian has said that the song is "a gentle country ballad that tells the story of the pair patching up the relationship that was damaged after Williams left Take That in 1995." It debuted at number two on the UK Singles Chart, making the song Williams' 28th top ten entry on the chart. "Shame" has also charted within the top 10 and top 20 in Denmark, Italy, Germany, Belgium, Ireland and the Netherlands. Yahoo! Music has ranked the video for "Shame" as the 14th best video of 2010.

The compilation does not include "United", a single released by Williams in 2000 as part of Pepsi's "Ask for More" advertising campaign, and three singles only released in certain territories: "Win Some Lose Some", "Better Man" and "Bongo Bong and Je Ne T'aime Plus".

== Critical reception ==
Professional ratings
Review scores
| Source | Rating |
|---|---|
| AllMusic | 4/5 stars |
| BBC Music | (favorable) |
| USA Today | 3.5/4 stars |
| Yahoo! Music UK | (7/10) |

John Bush from AllMusic gave the album four stars out of five. He said that even in its most basic edition, the album presents "no less than 39 examples of what made Robbie Williams a fascinating millennial superstar". He described Williams as "ambitious and self-deprecating, sensitive and boorish, dynamic and introverted" and that the album "presents a much richer picture of Williams' discography". Bush concluded his review by saying that "In and Out of Consciousness certainly offers a full portrait of Robbie Williams, the greatest pop star of the '90s and 2000s that few people appeared to respect but everyone enjoyed."

Sean Egan from BBC Music said that "Many of the songs are amongst the strongest chart hits of the new millennium, especially Williams’ collaborations with Guy Chambers". Egan said that "The sequencing is bizarre but has its own kind of logic, working backwards chronologically" and as "the familiar tunes go by, one is struck by the fact that Williams is both underrated [...] and overrated." He also stated that had Williams "not been sacked by Take That, he would never have been motivated to prove himself with edgy, knowing music light years beyond the boyband." Egan concluded his review by saying that "If this compilation is closing a chapter, the jury is still out on whether the next one is going to be a gripper."

== Track listing ==
In and Out of Consciousness: Greatest Hits 1990–2010 is available in several formats: a two CD standard edition, a three CD deluxe edition with rarities and B-sides, a DVD edition which includes the music videos of the standard edition and an "ultimate edition" which includes all three CDs, the two DVDs and a bonus third DVD with a live recording of Williams' concert at the Velodrom, Berlin in 2005.

CD 1
| No. | Title | Writer(s) | Album | Length |
|---|---|---|---|---|
| 1. | "Shame" (with Gary Barlow) | Robbie Williams, Gary Barlow | Previously unreleased | 3:59 |
| 2. | "Heart and I" | Williams, Barlow | Previously unreleased | 4:41 |
| 3. | "Morning Sun" | Williams, Danny Spencer, Kelvin Andrews, Richard Scott, Scott Ralph, Don Black | Reality Killed the Video Star | 4:06 |
| 4. | "You Know Me" | Williams, Spencer, Andrews, Françoise Hardy | Reality Killed the Video Star | 4:20 |
| 5. | "Bodies" (radio edit) | Williams, Craig Russo, Brandon Christy | Reality Killed the Video Star | 4:02 |
| 6. | "She's Madonna" (with Pet Shop Boys) (radio edit) | Williams, Neil Tennant, Chris Lowe | Rudebox | 4:00 |
| 7. | "Lovelight" | Lewis Taylor | Rudebox | 4:02 |
| 8. | "Rudebox" (radio edit) | Williams, Andrews, Spencer, Bill Laswell, Carl Aiken, William Collins, Sly Dunbar, Robbie Shakespeare | Rudebox | 3:47 |
| 9. | "Sin Sin Sin" (radio edit) | Williams, Stephen Duffy, Chris Heath | Intensive Care | 4:03 |
| 10. | "Advertising Space" | Williams, Duffy | Intensive Care | 4:38 |
| 11. | "Make Me Pure" (radio edit) | Williams, Duffy, Heath | Intensive Care | 3:48 |
| 12. | "Tripping" (radio edit) | Williams, Duffy | Intensive Care | 4:03 |
| 13. | "Misunderstood" | Williams, Duffy | Greatest Hits | 3:59 |
| 14. | "Radio" | Williams, Duffy | Greatest Hits | 3:51 |
| 15. | "Sexed Up" (radio edit) | Williams, Guy Chambers | Escapology | 4:10 |
| 16. | "Something Beautiful" (radio edit) | Williams, Chambers | Escapology | 4:01 |
| 17. | "Come Undone" (radio edit) | Williams, Boots Ottestad, Ashley Hamilton, Daniel Pierre | Escapology | 3:54 |
| 18. | "Feel" (radio edit) | Williams, Chambers | Escapology | 3:41 |
| 19. | "Mr. Bojangles" | Jerry Jeff Walker | Swing When You're Winning | 3:18 |

CD 2
| No. | Title | Writer(s) | Album | Length |
|---|---|---|---|---|
| 1. | "I Will Talk and Hollywood Will Listen" | Williams, Chambers | Swing When You're Winning | 3:14 |
| 2. | "Somethin' Stupid" (with Nicole Kidman) | Carson Parks | Swing When You're Winning | 2:50 |
| 3. | "The Road to Mandalay" (radio edit) | Williams, Chambers | Sing When You're Winning | 3:18 |
| 4. | "Eternity" | Williams, Chambers | Single release | 5:00 |
| 5. | "Let Love Be Your Energy" (radio mix) | Williams, Chambers | Sing When You're Winning | 4:04 |
| 6. | "Supreme" | Williams, Chambers, Freddie Perren, Dino Fekaris | Sing When You're Winning | 4:15 |
| 7. | "Kids" (with Kylie Minogue) (radio edit) | Williams, Chambers | Sing When You're Winning and Light Years | 4:19 |
| 8. | "Rock DJ" | Williams, Chambers, Andrews, Nelson Pigford, Ekundayo Paris | Sing When You're Winning | 4:17 |
| 9. | "It's Only Us" | Williams, Chambers | I've Been Expecting You (2002 re-release) | 2:51 |
| 10. | "She's the One" | Karl Wallinger | I've Been Expecting You | 4:19 |
| 11. | "Strong" (radio edit) | Williams, Chambers | I've Been Expecting You | 4:19 |
| 12. | "No Regrets" (radio edit) | Williams, Chambers | I've Been Expecting You | 4:44 |
| 13. | "Millennium" (radio edit) | Williams, Chambers, Leslie Bricusse, John Barry | I've Been Expecting You | 3:45 |
| 14. | "Let Me Entertain You" | Williams, Chambers | Life Thru a Lens | 4:22 |
| 15. | "Angels" | Williams, Chambers | Life Thru a Lens | 4:27 |
| 16. | "South of the Border" | Williams, Chambers | Life Thru a Lens | 3:54 |
| 17. | "Lazy Days" | Williams, Chambers | Life Thru a Lens | 3:54 |
| 18. | "Old Before I Die" | Williams, Eric Bazilian, Desmond Child | Life Thru a Lens | 3:53 |
| 19. | "Freedom" | George Michael | Single release | 4:18 |
| 20. | "Everything Changes" (with Take That) | Barlow, Mike Ward, Eliot Kennedy, Cary Baylis | Everything Changes | 3:33 |

CD 3: B-sides and rarities (Deluxe and Ultimate edition only)
| No. | Title | Writer(s) | Album | Length |
|---|---|---|---|---|
| 1. | "Often" | Gary Nuttall | B-side of "Kids" | 2:47 |
| 2. | "Karaoke Star" | Williams, Chambers | B-side of "Kids" | 4:07 |
| 3. | "Toxic" | Williams, Chambers | B-side of "Eternity/The Road to Mandalay" | 3:48 |
| 4. | "My Culture" (with 1 Giant Leap & Maxi Jazz) | Williams, Maxi Jazz, Jamie Catto, Duncan Bridgeman, Nigel Butler | Appeared as a featured artist on 1 Giant Leap's self-titled debut album | 5:38 |
| 5. | "Nobody Someday" | Williams, Chambers | B-side of "Feel" | 2:53 |
| 6. | "Get a Little High" | Williams, Ottestad | B-side of "Sexed Up" | 3:54 |
| 7. | "One Fine Day" | Williams | B-side of "Come Undone" | 3:35 |
| 8. | "Coffee, Tea and Sympathy" | Williams, Billy Morrison, Glen Ballard | B-side of "Something Beautiful" | 4:35 |
| 9. | "Do Me Now" | Williams, Ottestad, Morrison | B-side of "Misunderstood" | 3:17 |
| 10. | "The Postcard" | Duffy | B-side of "Misunderstood" | 3:11 |
| 11. | "Meet the Stars" | Williams, Duffy | B-side of "Tripping" | 4:27 |
| 12. | "Don't Stop Talking" | Williams, Duffy | Digital single release | 4:46 |
| 13. | "Don't Say No" | Williams, Duffy | B-side of "Advertising Space" | 4:24 |
| 14. | "Lonestar Rising" | Williams, Andrews, Spencer | B-side of "Rudebox" | 3:52 |
| 15. | "Lola" | Ray Davies | Recorded for the celebration of the 40th birthday of BBC Radio 1 in 2007 | 4:11 |
| 16. | "The Only One I Know" | John Baker, Martin Blunt, Jon Brookes, Tim Burgess, Rob Collins | Appeared as a featured artist on the track on Mark Ronson's album Version | 3:57 |
| 17. | "Elastik" | Andrews, Scott, Spencer | B-side of "Morning Sun" | 4:36 |
| 18. | "Long Walk Home" | Martin Page | Previously unreleased | 5:12 |
| 19. | "Dogs & Birds" (Digital download only bonus track) | Kelvin Andrews, Daniel Spencer, Richard Scott | Previously unreleased | 4:07 |
| 20. | "Email From a Vampire" (Digital download only bonus track) | Williams, Spencer, Andrews | Previously unreleased | 3:21 |

DVD 1
| No. | Title | Director(s) | Length |
|---|---|---|---|
| 1. | "Shame" (with Gary Barlow) | Vaughan Arnell | 3:51 |
| 2. | "Morning Sun" | Vaughan Arnell | 3:46 |
| 3. | "You Know Me" | Vaughan Arnell | 4:22 |
| 4. | "Bodies" | Vaughan Arnell | 4:02 |
| 5. | "She's Madonna" (with Pet Shop Boys) | Johan Renck | 5:42 |
| 6. | "Lovelight" | Jake Nava | 4:00 |
| 7. | "Rudebox" | Seb Janiak | 3:46 |
| 8. | "Sin Sin Sin" | Vaughan Arnell | 4:38 |
| 9. | "Advertising Space" | David LaChapelle | 4:38 |
| 10. | "Make Me Pure" | Russell Thomas | 3:54 |
| 11. | "Tripping" | Johan Renck | 4:13 |
| 12. | "Misunderstood" | Julian Gibbs | 5:22 |
| 13. | "Radio" | Vaughan Arnell | 3:49 |
| 14. | "Sexed Up" | Jonas Åkerlund | 4:08 |
| 15. | "Something Beautiful" | James Tonkin | 5:32 |
| 16. | "Come Undone" | Jonas Åkerlund | 4:34 |
| 17. | "Feel" | Vaughan Arnell | 4:21 |
| 18. | "Mr. Bojangles" | Hamish Hamilton | 3:35 |

DVD 2
| No. | Title | Director(s) | Length |
|---|---|---|---|
| 1. | "I Will Talk and Hollywood Will Listen" | Hamish Hamilton | 3:32 |
| 2. | "Somethin' Stupid" (with Nicole Kidman) | Vaughan Arnell | 3:09 |
| 3. | "The Road to Mandalay" | Vaughan Arnell | 4:08 |
| 4. | "Eternity" | Vaughan Arnell | 4:33 |
| 5. | "Let Love Be Your Energy" | Olly Reid | 4:06 |
| 6. | "Supreme" | Vaughan Arnell | 4:23 |
| 7. | "Kids" (with Kylie Minogue) | Simon Hilton | 4:46 |
| 8. | "Rock DJ" | Vaughan Arnell | 4:14 |
| 9. | "It's Only Us" | Simon Hilton | 3:10 |
| 10. | "She's the One" | Dom and Nic | 5:05 |
| 11. | "Strong" | Simon Hilton | 4:37 |
| 12. | "No Regrets" | Pedro Romhanyi | 5:11 |
| 13. | "Millennium" | Vaughan Arnell | 3:37 |
| 14. | "Let Me Entertain You" | Vaughan Arnell | 3:58 |
| 15. | "Angels" | Vaughan Arnell | 3:56 |
| 16. | "South of the Border" | Thomas Q Napper | 3:41 |
| 17. | "Lazy Days" | Thomas Q Napper | 3:52 |
| 18. | "Old Before I Die" | David Mould | 3:47 |
| 19. | "Freedom" | Hammer & Tongs | 4:20 |
| 20. | "Everything Changes" (with Take That) | Gregg Masuak | 3:36 |

DVD 3 (Ultimate edition only) Live at the Velodrom, Berlin in 2005
| No. | Title | Length |
|---|---|---|
| 1. | "Ghosts" |
| 2. | "Feel" |
| 3. | "A Place to Crash" |
| 4. | "Supreme" |
| 5. | "The Trouble With Me" |
| 6. | "Advertising Space" |
| 7. | "Spread Your Wings" |
| 8. | "Angels" |
| 9. | "Millennium" |
| 10. | "Come Undone" |
| 11. | "Sin Sin Sin" |
| 12. | "Tripping" |
| 13. | "No Regrets" |
| 14. | "Rock DJ" |
| 15. | "Make Me Pure" |

== Personnel ==
Credits for In and Out of Consciousness: Greatest Hits 1990–2010 adapted from AllMusic.

- K. Andrews – composer
- Kelvin Andrews – composer
- Kevin Andrews – composer
- Vaughan Arnell – photography
- G. Barlow – composer
- Gary Barlow – composer
- John Barry – composer
- Eric Bazilian – composer
- Leslie Bricusse – composer
- Julian Broad – cover photo, photography
- Hamish Brown – photography
- Johnny Buzzerio – photography
- Guy Chambers – arranger, composer, producer
- Desmond Child – composer
- Brandon Christy – composer
- Nick Clarke – photography
- Bob Clearmountain – mixing
- Chris Clunn – photography
- Elain Constantine – photography
- Tony Cousins – mastering
- S. Duffy – producer
- Stephen Duffy – composer
- Dino Fekaris – composer
- Dean Freeman – photography
- Serban Ghenea – mixing
- Sean Gleason – photography
- Fergus Greer – photography
- Stephen Hague – mixing, producer
- Hammer & Tongs – photography
- Françoise Hardy – composer
- C.S. Heath – composer
- Tom Hingston – art direction, design
- Trevor Horn – producer
- Jamie Hughes – photography
- Seb Janiak – photography
- Eliot Kennedy – producer
- Nick Knight – photography
- Lisa Marie Kurbikoff – photography
- Chris Lowe – composer
- Bob Ludwig – mastering
- George Michael – composer
- Simon Niblett – photography
- Robert Orton – mixing
- Boots Ottestad – composer
- Scarlett Page – photography
- Ekundayo Paris – composer
- C. Carson Parks – composer
- Freddie Perren – composer
- Pet Shop Boys – producer
- Nelson Pigford – composer
- Steve Power – mixing, producer
- Mark Ronson – producer
- Craig Russo – composer
- S. Dunbar – composer
- Luis Sanchis – photography
- Roger Sargent – photography
- Mary Scanlon – photography
- Al Schmitt – engineer, mixing
- Richard Scott – composer
- Soul Mekanik – producer
- Danny Spencer – composer
- L. Taylor – composer
- Neil Tennant – composer
- Jerry Jeff Walker – composer
- Karl Wallinger – composer
- Mike Ward – producer
- Tim Weidner – mixing
- Jeremy Wheatley – mixing
- R. Williams – composer, producer
- Robbie Williams – composer

== Charts ==
=== Weekly charts ===
Weekly chart performance for In and Out of Consciousness: Greatest Hits 1990–2010
| Chart (2010) | Peak position |
|---|---|
| Australian Albums (ARIA) | 3 |
| Austrian Albums (Ö3 Austria) | 1 |
| Belgian Albums (Ultratop Flanders) | 4 |
| Belgian Albums (Ultratop Wallonia) | 2 |
| Croatian Albums (HDU) | 2 |
| Czech Albums (ČNS IFPI) | 3 |
| Danish Albums (Hitlisten) | 2 |
| Dutch Albums (Album Top 100) | 3 |
| European Top 100 Albums (Billboard) | 1 |
| Finnish Albums (Suomen virallinen lista) | 16 |
| French Albums (SNEP) | 155 |
| German Albums (Offizielle Top 100) | 1 |
| Greece Albums (IFPI) | 22 |
| Hungarian Albums (MAHASZ) | 9 |
| Irish Albums (IRMA) | 2 |
| Italian Albums (FIMI) | 3 |
| Italian Albums (Musica e dischi) | 3 |
| Mexican Albums (AMPROFON) | 22 |
| New Zealand Albums (RMNZ) | 17 |
| Norwegian Albums (VG-lista) | 5 |
| Polish Albums (ZPAV) | 12 |
| Portuguese Albums (AFP) | 4 |
| Scottish Albums (Official Charts) | 1 |
| Spanish Albums (Promusicae) | 3 |
| Swedish Albums (Sverigetopplistan) | 4 |
| Swiss Albums (Schweizer Hitparade) | 4 |
| UK Albums (Official Charts) | 1 |

=== Year-end charts ===
Weekly chart performance for In and Out of Consciousness: Greatest Hits 1990–2010
| Chart (2010) | Position |
|---|---|
| Austrian Albums (Ö3 Austria) | 52 |
| Belgian Albums (Ultratop Flanders) | 42 |
| Belgian Albums (Ultratop Wallonia) | 52 |
| Danish Albums (Hitlisten) | 28 |
| Dutch Albums (Album Top 100) | 39 |
| European Top 100 Albums (Billboard) | 40 |
| German Albums (Offizielle Top 100) | 21 |
| UK Albums (OCC) | 14 |

=== Decade-end charts ===
Decade-end chart performance for In and Out of Consciousness: Greatest Hits 1990–2010
| Chart (2010–2019) | Position |
|---|---|
| UK Albums (OCC) | 87 |

== Certifications ==
| Region | Certification | Certified units/sales |
|---|---|---|
| Australia (ARIA) | Gold | 35,000^{^} |
| Austria (IFPI Austria) | Gold | 10,000^{*} |
| Belgium (BRMA) | Gold | 15,000^{*} |
| Denmark (IFPI Danmark) | Gold | 15,000^{^} |
| France (SNEP) | Gold | 50,000^{*} |
| Germany (BVMI) | Platinum | 200,000^{‡} |
| Ireland (IRMA) | Gold | 7,500^{^} |
| Italy (FIMI) | Platinum | 60,000^{*} |
| New Zealand (RMNZ) | Platinum | 15,000^{‡} |
| Portugal (AFP) | Platinum | 20,000^{^} |
| United Kingdom (BPI) | 2× Platinum | 600,000^{^} |
Summaries
| Europe (IFPI) | Platinum | 1,000,000^{*} |
^{*} Sales figures based on certification alone.^{^} Shipments figures based on certification alone.^{‡} Sales+streaming figures based on certification alone.

== Release history ==
| Region | Date | Label | Format |
|---|---|---|---|
| Germany | 8 October 2010 | Virgin Records | CD, CD + DVD; Digital download |
| Australia | 8 October 2010 | Virgin Records | CD, CD + DVD; Digital download |
| Austria | 8 October 2010 | Virgin Records | CD, CD + DVD; Digital download |
| Switzerland | 8 October 2010 | Virgin Records | CD, CD + DVD; Digital download |
| United Kingdom | 11 October 2010 | Virgin Records | CD, CD + DVD; Digital download |
| France | 11 October 2010 | Virgin Records | CD, CD + DVD; Digital download |
| Mexico | 11 October 2010 | EMI Music | CD, CD + DVD; Digital download |
| United States | 12 October 2010 | Astralwerks | CD, CD + DVD; Digital download |
| Canada | 12 October 2010 | Astralwerks | CD, CD + DVD; Digital download |
| Brazil | 13 October 2010 | EMI Music | CD, CD + DVD; Digital download |
