= XXV (Robbie Williams album) =

Greatest hits album by Robbie Williams
- Released: 9 September 2022
- Length: 79:34
- Label: Columbia
- Producers: Guy Chambers; Richard Flack

Robbie Williams chronology
| The Christmas Present (2019) | XXV (2022) | Better Man (Original Motion Picture Soundtrack) (2024) |

Singles from XXV
- 1. "Angels (XXV)" Released: 7 June 2022; 2. "Lost (XXV)" Released: 5 August 2022

XXV is a greatest hits album by English singer Robbie Williams, released through Columbia Records on 9 September 2022. The album marks the 25th anniversary of Williams's solo career, and contains re-recorded and orchestrated versions of songs from his career, which were reworked by Jules Buckley, Guy Chambers and Steve Sidwell with the Metropole Orkest. The XXV version of "Angels" was released as the lead single, followed by the promotional single "Eternity/The Road to Mandalay" and the new song "Lost" as the second official single. The deluxe edition of the album adds 10 tracks, including four more original songs—"Disco Symphony", "More Than This", "Home Thoughts from Abroad" and "The World and Her Mother". The album debuted at number one on the UK Albums Chart, with Williams breaking the record for most number-one albums among solo acts. The album was supported by the XXV Tour.

== Background ==
On 7 June 2022, Williams announced that his next album XXV, would be released on 9 September 2022. It features new versions of his hit songs, plus new material. On the same day as this announcement, Williams released "Angels (XXV)", a reworked version of "Angels".

== Singles ==
The first single taken from XXV was a reimagined version of his hit single "Angels" and was released on 7 June 2022. On 10 June 2022, "Angels (XXV)" reached number 92 on the UK Official Singles Sales Chart, rising to 74 a week later.

The second official single was "Lost (XXV)". It was released on 5 August 2022.

== Commercial performance ==
XXV became Williams's fourteenth number one album on the UK Albums Chart, surpassing Elvis Presley as the solo act with the most UK number one albums. The album also topped the charts in Ireland, Scotland and Netherlands, while also reaching the top five in Australia, Austria, Belgium, Germany and Switzerland.

== Track listing ==
All tracks are subtitled "XXV". The Australian physical edition follows the standard edition order below but removes "Candy" and "She's the One" and includes "Better Man" for a total of 18 tracks.

XXV standard edition
| No. | Title | Original album | Length |
|---|---|---|---|
| 1. | "Let Me Entertain You" | Life thru a Lens (1997) | 3:38 |
| 2. | "Come Undone" | Escapology (2002) | 4:18 |
| 3. | "Love My Life" | The Heavy Entertainment Show (2016) | 3:25 |
| 4. | "Millennium" | I've Been Expecting You (1998) | 3:49 |
| 5. | "The Road to Mandalay" | Sing When You're Winning (2000) | 4:41 |
| 6. | "Tripping" | Intensive Care (2005) | 3:54 |
| 7. | "Bodies" | Reality Killed the Video Star (2009) | 3:54 |
| 8. | "Candy" | Take the Crown (2012) | 3:13 |
| 9. | "Supreme" | Sing When You're Winning (2000) | 4:25 |
| 10. | "Strong" | I've Been Expecting You (1998) | 4:14 |
| 11. | "Eternity" | Non-album single (2000) | 5:27 |
| 12. | "No Regrets" | I've Been Expecting You (1998) | 5:03 |
| 13. | "She's the One" | I've Been Expecting You (1998) | 4:30 |
| 14. | "Feel" | Escapology (2002) | 4:24 |
| 15. | "Rock DJ" | Sing When You're Winning (2000) | 4:53 |
| 16. | "Kids" (with Kylie Minogue) | Sing When You're Winning and Light Years (2000) | 3:30 |
| 17. | "Angels" | Life thru a Lens (1997) | 4:25 |
| 18. | "Lost" | Previously unreleased | 4:16 |
| 19. | "Nobody Someday" | B-side from "Feel" (2002) | 3:35 |
| Total length: | | | 79:34 |

Deluxe edition
| No. | Title | Original album | Length |
|---|---|---|---|
| 20. | "Lazy Days" | Life thru a Lens (1997) | 4:30 |
| 21. | "Hot Fudge" | Escapology (2002) | 3:41 |
| 22. | "Sexed Up" | Escapology (2002) | 3:45 |
| 23. | "More Than This" | Previously unreleased | 4:08 |
| 24. | "Disco Symphony" | The Boy in the Dress (Original Cast Recording) (2020) | 3:49 |
| 25. | "Better Man" | Sing When You're Winning (2000) | 4:13 |
| 26. | "Home Thoughts from Abroad" | Military Wives soundtrack (2019) | 3:20 |
| 27. | "The World and Her Mother" | Previously unreleased | 4:10 |
| 28. | "Into the Silence" | Take the Crown (2012) | 4:50 |
| 29. | "Angels" (Beethoven AI) | Life thru a Lens (1997) | 4:52 |
| Total length: | | | 121:11 |

== Charts ==
=== Weekly charts ===
Weekly chart performance for XXV
| Chart (2022) | Peak position |
|---|---|
| Australian Albums (ARIA) | 2 |
| Austrian Albums (Ö3 Austria) | 3 |
| Belgian Albums (Ultratop Flanders) | 3 |
| Belgian Albums (Ultratop Wallonia) | 7 |
| Czech Albums (ČNS IFPI) | 26 |
| Dutch Albums (Album Top 100) | 1 |
| French Albums (SNEP) | 11 |
| German Albums (Offizielle Top 100) | 3 |
| Hungarian Albums (MAHASZ) | 12 |
| Irish Albums (Official Charts) | 1 |
| Italian Albums (FIMI) | 13 |
| New Zealand Albums (RMNZ) | 40 |
| Polish Albums (ZPAV) | 12 |
| Portuguese Albums (AFP) | 5 |
| Scottish Albums (Official Charts) | 1 |
| Spanish Albums (Promusicae) | 10 |
| Swiss Albums (Schweizer Hitparade) | 4 |
| Taiwanese Albums (Five Music) | 3 |
| UK Albums (Official Charts) | 1 |

=== Year-end charts ===
Year-end chart performance for XXV
| Chart (2022) | Position |
|---|---|
| Belgian Albums (Ultratop Flanders) | 180 |
| German Albums (Offizielle Top 100) | 55 |
| Swiss Albums (Schweizer Hitparade) | 73 |

== Certifications ==
Certifications and sales for XXV
| Region | Certification | Certified units/sales |
|---|---|---|
| United Kingdom (BPI) | Silver | 60,000^{‡} |
^{‡} Sales+streaming figures based on certification alone.
