= Let Me Entertain You Tour =

2015 concert tour by Robbie Williams

- Tour by Robbie Williams
- Promotional poster for the tour
- Location: Asia; Europe; Oceania
- Start date: 25 March 2015
- End date: 3 November 2015
- Legs: 4
- No. of shows: 42

Robbie Williams concert chronology
- Swings Both Ways Live (2014); Let Me Entertain You Tour (2015); The Heavy Entertainment Show Tour (2017–18)

The Let Me Entertain You Tour was the eleventh concert tour by the English recording artist, Robbie Williams. The tour began in March 2015 in Europe and continued into Asia and Australasia, with over 40 shows. The tour grossed $27.1 million with 235,100 tickets sold.

== Background ==
Shortly after the birth of his son, Williams announced the tour via YouTube. The video displays the pop singer walking around a neighbourhood in Los Angeles. He recites an updated, spoken word version of his hit, "Let Me Entertain You". Williams exclaimed the tour will visit new places or areas where he has not toured in a long time. The announcement was shortly followed with a posting on his official website. In May 2015, Williams performed in Israel for the first time, before 50,000 fans at Yarkon Park in Tel Aviv. He began the performance wearing devil horns. In the second half of the show, he donned a kilt. Underneath he wore tight black briefs with a tiger on the front. The shows in Paris, France were recorded for a live album which is available on Williams' official website.

== Opening acts ==
- Baskery (Europe, Leg 1)
- Lawson (Australasia)
- Avalanche City (New Zealand)
- Ninet Tayeb (Tel Aviv)

== Setlist ==
The following setlist is obtained from the concerts held in Madrid and Barcelona, March 2015. This setlist does not represent all concerts during the tour.

1. "Video Introduction" (contains elements of "O Fortuna")
2. "Let Me Entertain You"
3. "Rock DJ"
4. "We Will Rock You" / "I Love Rock n Roll"
5. "Monsoon"
6. "Tripping"
7. "Bodies" (contains excerpts from "Royals")
8. "Eternity/The Road to Mandalay" (performed with Baskery)
9. "Video Sequence"
10. "Minnie The Moocher"
11. "Swing Supreme" (contains excerpts from "I Will Survive")
12. "Ignition (Remix)" / "Shout"
13. "Motherfucker" (contains excerpts from "Twinkle, Twinkle, Little Star")
14. "Better Man"
15. "Video Sequence"
16. "Radio" (contains elements of "Push It")
17. "No Regrets"
18. "Come Undone" (contains excerpts from "I Still Haven't Found What I'm Looking For")
19. "Candy"
20. "Feel"
21. "Millennium" (contains excerpts from "99 Problems")
22. "Kids" (contains elements of "Back in Black")

Encore

23. "Bohemian Rhapsody"
24. "Angels"

Notes

- During the show of 25 March in Madrid, Williams performed "Better Man" with his father. During the same show, he dedicated his performance of "Angels" to the victims of the Germanwings Flight 9525 crash.
- "No Regrets" contained excerpts from "Fastlove" during the show in Madrid and "Freedom! '90" for the concert in Barcelona.

== Tour dates ==
List of 2015 concerts
Date	City	Country	Venue
25 March 2015	Madrid	Spain	Barclaycard Center
27 March 2015	Barcelona	Spain	Palau Sant Jordi
30 March 2015	Paris	France	Zénith Paris
31 March 2015	Paris	France	Zénith Paris
1 April 2015	Paris	France	Zénith Paris
5 April 2015	Kaunas	Lithuania	Žalgiris Arena
6 April 2015	Riga	Latvia	Arena Riga
9 April 2015	Saint Petersburg	Russia	Ice Palace
12 April 2015	Moscow	Russia	Olimpiysky
15 April 2015	Minsk	Belarus	Minsk-Arena
17 April 2015	Kraków	Poland	Tauron Arena
18 April 2015	Bratislava	Slovakia	Zimný Štadión Ondreja Nepelu
21 April 2015	Linz	Austria	TipsArena Linz
22 April 2015	Linz	Austria	TipsArena Linz
25 April 2015	Abu Dhabi	United Arab Emirates	du Arena
2 May 2015	Tel Aviv	Israel	Yarkon Park
13 June 2015^{[A]}	Landgraaf	Netherlands	Megaland Landgraaf
17 June 2015	Belgrade	Serbia	Ušće Park
20 June 2015^{[B]}	Malakasa	Greece	Terra Vibe Park
26 June 2015^{[C]}	Norrköping	Sweden	Bråvalla flygflottilj
28 June 2015^{[D]}	Odense	Denmark	Tusindårsskoven
4 July 2015^{[E]}	Werchter	Belgium	Werchter Festival Grounds
7 July 2015^{[F]}	Rome	Italy	Ippodromo delle Capannelle
12 July 2015^{[G]}	Monaco-Ville	Monaco	Place du Palais
17 July 2015	Bucharest	Romania	Piața Constituției
20 July 2015^{[H]}	Nyon	Switzerland	Plaine de l'Asse
23 July 2015^{[I]}	Lucca	Italy	Piazza Napoleone
25 July 2015^{[J]}	Barcelona	Spain	Platja del Fòrum
7 August 2015^{[K]}	Burgas	Bulgaria	Central Beach
10 August 2015^{[L]}	Budapest	Hungary	Óbudai Island
9 October 2015	Perth	Australia	Perth Arena
10 October 2015	Perth	Australia	Perth Arena
13 October 2015	Adelaide	Australia	Adelaide Entertainment Centre
14 October 2015	Adelaide	Australia	Adelaide Entertainment Centre
17 October 2015	Brisbane	Australia	Brisbane Entertainment Centre
22 October 2015	Melbourne	Australia	Rod Laver Arena
23 October 2015	Melbourne	Australia	Rod Laver Arena
24 October 2015	Melbourne	Australia	Rod Laver Arena
27 October 2015	Sydney	Australia	Allphones Arena
28 October 2015	Sydney	Australia	Allphones Arena
31 October 2015	Wellington	New Zealand	Basin Reserve
3 November 2015	Auckland	New Zealand	Vector Arena

Festivals and other miscellaneous performances

^{A} Pinkpop Festival
^{B} Rockwave Festival
^{C} Bråvalla Festival
^{D} Tinderbox Music Festival
^{E} TW Classic
^{F} Rock in Roma
^{G} Celebration of the Tenth Anniversary of the Reign of Prince Albert II
^{H} Paléo Festival
^{I} Lucca Summer Festival
^{J} Hard Rock Rising
^{K} Spirit of Burgas
^{L} Sziget Festival

Cancellations and rescheduled shows

26 April 2015	Abu Dhabi, United Arab Emirates	du Arena	Rescheduled to 25 April 2015
17 September 2015	Beijing, China	MasterCard Center	Cancelled
20 September 2015	Shanghai, China	Mercedes-Benz Arena	Cancelled
23 September 2015	Chek Lap Kok, Hong Kong	AsiaWorld–Arena	Cancelled
27 September 2015	Kuala Lumpur, Malaysia	Stadium Merdeka	Cancelled
30 September 2015	Bangkok, Thailand	Impact Arena	Cancelled
4 October 2015	Kallang, Singapore	Singapore Indoor Stadium	Cancelled

=== Box office score data ===
Venue	City	Tickets sold / Available	Gross revenue
Perth Arena	Perth	20,427 / 21,190 (96%)	$2,196,330
Brisbane Entertainment Centre	Brisbane	10,642 / 10,642 (100%)	$1,214,730
Rod Laver Arena	Melbourne	32,449 / 33,600 (97%)	$3,758,970
Allphones Arena	Sydney	22,419 / 23,320 (96%)	$2,531,970
TOTAL		85,937 / 88,752 (97%)	$9,702,000
