= Supreme (song) =

2000 single by Robbie Williams

- Artwork variant used in the UK, Europe and Australasia

Single by Robbie Williams

from the album Sing When You're Winning
- B-side: "Don't Do Love"; "Come Take Me Over"; "United"
- Released: 11 December 2000
- Studio: Master Rock (North London, England); Sarm Hook End (Reading, England)
- Length: 4:15
- Label: Chrysalis
- Songwriters: Robbie Williams; Guy Chambers; Freddie Perren; Dino Fekaris
- Producers: Guy Chambers; Steve Power

Robbie Williams singles chronology
"Kids" (2000)	"Supreme" (2000)	"Let Love Be Your Energy" (2001)

Music video
- "Supreme" on YouTube

Alternative cover
- Secondary artwork variant used in Europe and Australia

"Supreme" is a song by English singer Robbie Williams for his third studio album, Sing When You're Winning (2000). Chrysalis Records released the song as the third single from the album on 11 December 2000. Commercially, the single reached number four on the UK Singles Chart, topped the charts of Hungary and Poland, and peaked within the top 10 in six additional European countries and New Zealand.

== Composition ==
The bridge of the song contains an interpolation of Gloria Gaynor's "I Will Survive". The string instrument part is a François de Roubaix-composed piece from the José Giovanni-directed film Dernier domicile connu starring Lino Ventura and Marlène Jobert. The song was re-recorded in a swing tone and titled "Swing Supreme" for his 2013 album Swings Both Ways.

== Chart performance ==
The song became another success for Robbie Williams, reaching the top 10 in the United Kingdom, Switzerland, Austria, New Zealand, and several other countries. Williams also recorded a French version of the song that was released in France, peaking at number 12 and spending 34 weeks on the French chart, being certified Gold by the Syndicat National de l'Édition Phonographique (SNEP).

== Music video ==
The "Supreme" video, titled "Gentlemen racers" as seen in its opening credits, is a tribute to British Formula One driver Jackie Stewart. It was filmed on 11 November 2000. Williams portrays the fictitious character Bob Williams, a rival driver competing for the 1970s F1 World Championship. Williams eventually crashes his car, makes a surprise recovery, and ultimately loses the title when he gets diarrhoea before a race and is unable to line up on the starting grid due to getting locked into his caravan when the manager thought there was no one in the caravan. An epilogue reveals that Bob Williams went on to become a celebrated blues guitarist while Jackie Stewart won the championship.

The video includes stock footage of Stewart with Williams digitally inserted in many scenes, creating the near-perfect illusion of a neck-and-neck pursuit of the championship title. The video makes extensive use of the split-screen technique as it is often seen in movies from the 1960s and 70s (for instance in the 1966 feature racing movie Grand Prix), and the scenes with Robbie Williams were given a yellowed, grainy image texture in the digital editing process to match the faded look of the original 35mm celluloid footage with Jackie Stewart. As yet another movie cliché, fake newspaper headlines are shown intermittently to help narrate the story.

== Track listings ==
UK CD1 and cassette single

1. "Supreme" – 4:15
2. "Don't Do Love" – 4:56
3. "Come Take Me Over" – 4:13

UK CD2

1. "Supreme" – 4:15
2. "United" – 5:56
3. "Supreme" (recorded live at the Manchester Arena) – 4:18
4. "Supreme" (filmed live at the Manchester Arena) – 4:08

Australasian maxi-CD single

1. "Supreme" – 4:15
2. "United" – 5:56
3. "Supreme" (live from Manchester) – 4:18
4. "Don't Do Love" – 4:57
5. "Come Take Me Over" – 4:11

Australian CD single

1. "Supreme" – 4:15
2. "Rock DJ" – 4:15
3. "Kids" – 4:47

== Credits and personnel ==
Credits are taken from the Sing When You're Winning album booklet.

Studios

- Recorded at Master Rock Studios (North London, England) and Sarm Hook End (Reading, England)
- Mixed at Battery Studios (London, England)
- Mastered at Metropolis Mastering (London, England)

Personnel

- Robbie Williams – writing, lead vocals
- Guy Chambers – writing, all keyboards, production, arrangement
- Freddie Perren – writing
- Dino Fekaris – writing
- Claire Worrall – backing vocals
- Crystal Adams – backing vocals
- Marielle Hervé – backing vocals
- Neil Taylor – acoustic and electric guitars
- Phil Spalding – bass guitar
- Chris Sharrock – ambient drum kit
- Andy Duncan – drum programming
- Richard Flack – drum programming, Pro Tools
- Tony Pleeth – string loop
- Paul Kegg – string loop
- Richard Boothby – string loop
- Richard Campbell – string loop
- The London Session Orchestra – orchestra
- Gavyn Wright – concertmaster
- Nick Ingman – orchestration
- Isobel Griffiths – orchestral contractor
- Steve Price – orchestral engineering
- Steve Power – production, mixing
- Tony Cousins – mastering

== Charts ==
=== Weekly charts ===
2000–2001 weekly chart performance for "Supreme"
Chart (2000–2001)	Peak position
Australia (ARIA)	14
Austria (Ö3 Austria Top 40)	3
Belgium (Ultratop 50 Flanders)	29
Belgium (Ultratop 50 Wallonia)	4
Croatian International Airplay (HRT)	3
Europe (Eurochart Hot 100)	7
Europe (European Hit Radio)	1
Finland (Suomen virallinen lista)	16
Finland Airplay (Radiosoittolista)	3
France (SNEP)	12
Germany (GfK)	14
Hungary (Mahasz)	1
Ireland (IRMA)	10
Italy (FIMI)	4
Italy (Musica e dischi)	4
Latvia (Latvijas Top 30)	1
Netherlands (Dutch Top 40)	8
Netherlands (Single Top 100)	16
New Zealand (Recorded Music NZ)	3
Norway (VG-lista)	11
Poland Airplay (PiF PaF)	1
Scottish Singles Sales (Official Charts)	4
Spain Airplay (Top 40 Radio)	12
Sweden (Sverigetopplistan)	14
Switzerland (Schweizer Hitparade)	4
UK Singles (Official Charts)	4
UK Airplay (Music Week)	1

2021–2024 weekly chart performance for "Supreme"
Chart (2021–2024)	Peak position
Finland Airplay (Radiosoittolista)	72
Kazakhstan Airplay (TopHit)	91

=== Year-end charts ===
2000 year-end chart performance for "Supreme"
Chart (2000)	Position
UK Singles (OCC)	116

2001 year-end chart performance for "Supreme"
Chart (2001)	Position
Australia (ARIA)	85
Austria (Ö3 Austria Top 40)	28
Belgium (Ultratop 50 Wallonia)	30
Europe (Eurochart Hot 100)	27
Europe (European Hit Radio)	2
France (SNEP)	42
France Airplay (SNEP)	31
Germany (Media Control)	88
Latvia (Latvijas Top 50)	24
Netherlands (Dutch Top 40)	55
New Zealand (RIANZ)	35
Switzerland (Schweizer Hitparade)	45

2024 year-end chart performance for "Supreme"
Chart (2024)	Position
CIS Airplay (TopHit)	185

2025 year-end chart performance for "Supreme"
Chart (2025)	Position
CIS Airplay (TopHit)	195

== Certifications ==
Certifications and sales for "Supreme"
Region	Certification	Certified units/sales
Belgium (BRMA)	Gold	25,000^{*}
France (SNEP)	Gold	250,000^{*}
United Kingdom (BPI)	Silver	200,000^{^}
^{*} Sales figures based on certification alone.^{^} Shipments figures based on certification alone.

== Release history ==
Release dates and formats for "Supreme"
Region	Date	Format(s)	Label(s)	Ref.
United Kingdom	11 December 2000	CD; cassette	Chrysalis	
Australia	19 March 2001	Maxi-CD	Chrysalis; EMI	
Australia	21 May 2001	CD	Chrysalis; EMI	
