= Mussington =

Mussington is a surname. Notable people with the surname include:

- Ian Mussington (born 1967), American musician
- Louis Mussington (born 1961), French politician

== See also ==
- Thrussington
