= Something Beautiful (Robbie Williams song) =

2003 single by Robbie Williams

Single by Robbie Williams

from the album Escapology
- B-side: "Berliner Star"; "Coffee, Tea & Sympathy"
- Released: 21 May 2003
- Studio: Los Angeles, London
- Genre: Soul; R&B
- Length: 4:48 (album version); 4:01 (radio edit)
- Label: Chrysalis
- Songwriters: Guy Chambers; Robbie Williams
- Producers: Guy Chambers; Steve Power

Robbie Williams singles chronology
"Come Undone" (2003)	"Something Beautiful" (2003)	"Sexed Up" (2003)

Music video
- "Something Beautiful" on YouTube

"Something Beautiful" is a song co-written by English musicians Guy Chambers and Robbie Williams. Originally offered to Welsh singer Tom Jones, it was released as the third single from Williams' fifth studio album, Escapology (2002). The track was issued in Japan on 21 May 2003 and in Europe two months later, in July. "Something Beautiful" reached number three on the UK Singles Chart and peaked within the top 10 in Denmark, Ireland, the Netherlands, New Zealand, and Romania.

== Music video ==
The video of the song is influenced by reality shows like Pop Idol, and is one of the few with two different endings. An interactive version of the video was created to run on Sky Digital by weapon7 where viewers could vote through the red button and discover the backstory of the participants. A spokesman for Robbie Williams told the Daily Mirror, "We wanted to find someone with the 'essence' of Robbie to perform the new track in the video – it could be a woman."

At the start of the video, fans from all over Europe try to impress judges during the audition stage of fictional reality show Manufactured Miracles; one of the members on the selection panel is Williams' real-life father Pete Conway. Several contestants are put through to the next round, but only three emerge finalists: actor/singer Peter Caruana from Manchester, and students Rebecca Durrant and Bjorn Wenner from Essex and Hamburg respectively. They are groomed by a choreographer and singing coach, and given makeovers by stylists whilst experiencing the celebrity status lifestyle, with an interview at Capital FM and a stay at a luxury hotel before competing in the live shows, each finalist representing a different stage in Williams' career.

Two endings were filmed. In the first, viewers are asked to vote on Williams' website for whom they thought was the best performer. The second version of the video ends with Peter winning the competition before meeting Williams at a bus stop, the latter reading a newspaper with the headline "Robbie For a Week: Back to Reality for Final Three"—a reference to reality stars abandoned by once-loyal fans and management following brief success. As Peter was unaware he would meet Williams, his surprise was genuine.

Rebecca Durrant, who later became a police officer, told the Sunday Mirror the experience put her off fame stating "After I filmed the video I realised I didn't want to face the pressure, the secrecy, the non-stop filming and constant hair and make-up touchups... the closest I get to singing now is karaoke in my local pub." Similarly, in an interview with the Salford Advertiser, Peter Caruana stated, "I decided it was time to give Robbie a rest – he's been good to me, but enough is enough. In a way I think it has held me back and I really want to get back to treading the boards, because that's what I trained for." He has since featured in commercials for Chicago Town Pizza as a Simon Cowell lookalike.

== Track listings ==
UK and Australasian CD single

1. "Something Beautiful" – 4:48
2. "Berliner Star" – 3:52
3. "Coffee, Tea & Sympathy" – 4:35
4. Photo gallery

UK and Australian DVD single

1. "Something Beautiful" (interactive video)
2. "Berliner Star" (audio) – 3:52
3. "Coffee, Tea & Sympathy" (audio) – 4:35
4. Robbie video clip

UK cassette single

1. "Something Beautiful" – 4:48
2. "Berliner Star" – 3:52
3. "Coffee, Tea & Sympathy" – 4:35

European CD single

1. "Something Beautiful" – 4:48
2. "Berliner Star" – 3:54

Japanese CD single

1. "Something Beautiful (サムシング・ビューティフル)" (album version)
2. "Cursed (カーズド)" – 3:52 (album version)
3. "Feel" (video clips)

== Credits and personnel ==
Credits are taken from the Escapology album booklet.

Recording

- Recorded in Los Angeles and London
- Mixed at The Record Plant (Los Angeles)
- Mastered at Marcussen Mastering (Los Angeles)

Personnel

- Robbie Williams – writing, lead vocals
- Guy Chambers – writing, piano, Wurlitzer, Hammond organ, production, arrangement
- Katie Kissoon – backing vocals
- Tessa Niles – backing vocals
- Gary Nuttall – backing vocals, electric guitars
- Claire Worrall – backing vocals
- Paul Williams – backing vocals
- Neil Taylor – electric guitars
- Yolanda Charles – bass guitars
- Phil Spalding – bass guitars
- Andy Wallace – Hammond organ
- Jeremy Stacey – drums
- Luís Jardim – percussion
- Dave Bishop – brass
- Simon Gardner – brass
- Neil Sidwell – brass
- Steve Sidwell – brass
- The London Session Orchestra – orchestra
- Gavyn Wright – concertmaster
- Nick Ingman – orchestral arrangement
- Steve Price – orchestral engineering
- Tom Jenkins – assistant orchestral engineering
- Isobel Griffiths – orchestral contracting
- Jim Brumby – programming, additional engineering
- Steve Power – production, mixing
- J.D. Andrew – assistant mixing
- Richard Flack – engineering, programming
- Steve Marcussen – mastering

== Charts ==
=== Weekly charts ===
Chart (2003–2004)	Peak position
Australia (ARIA)	24
Austria (Ö3 Austria Top 40)	19
Belgium (Ultratop 50 Flanders)	48
Belgium (Ultratip Bubbling Under Wallonia)	3
Croatia (HRT)	1
Denmark (Tracklisten)	8
Europe (Eurochart Hot 100)	8
Europe (European Hit Radio)	3
Finland Airplay (Radiosoittolista)	4
France (SNEP)	70
Germany (GfK)	46
Hungary (Rádiós Top 40)	7
Ireland (IRMA)	6
Italy (FIMI)	22
Italy (Musica e dischi)	13
Latvia (Latvijas Top 40)	9
Netherlands (Dutch Top 40)	8
Netherlands (Single Top 100)	16
New Zealand (Recorded Music NZ)	7
Romania (Romanian Top 100)	6
Scottish Singles Sales (Official Charts)	1
Switzerland (Schweizer Hitparade)	52
UK Singles (Official Charts)	3
UK Airplay (Music Week)	3

=== Year-end charts ===
Chart (2003)	Position
Netherlands (Dutch Top 40)	42
New Zealand (RIANZ)	35
Romania (Romanian Top 100)	47
UK Singles (OCC)	93
UK Airplay (Music Week)	25

Chart (2004)	Position
Hungary (Rádiós Top 40)	88

== Release history ==
Region	Date	Format(s)	Label(s)	Ref.
Japan	21 May 2003	CD	Chrysalis	
Europe	7 July 2003	CD	Chrysalis	
United Kingdom	28 July 2003	CD; DVD; cassette	Chrysalis	
Australia	18 August 2003	CD	Chrysalis	
