= Let Love Be Your Energy =

2001 single by Robbie Williams

Single by Robbie Williams

from the album Sing When You're Winning
- B-side: "My Way" (live); "Rolling Stone"
- Released: 9 April 2001
- Studio: Master Rock (North London, England); Sarm Hook End (Reading, England)
- Genre: Alternative rock
- Length: 4:59 (album version); 4:06 (radio mix)
- Label: Chrysalis
- Songwriters: Robbie Williams; Guy Chambers
- Producers: Guy Chambers; Steve Power

Robbie Williams singles chronology
"Supreme" (2000)	"Let Love Be Your Energy" (2001)	"Eternity" / "The Road to Mandalay" (2001)

Music video
- "Let Love Be Your Energy" on YouTube

"Let Love Be Your Energy" is a song by English singer Robbie Williams, released in April 2001 as the fourth single from his third studio album, Sing When You're Winning (2000). The song reached number 10 in the United Kingdom (his first to miss the top five since 1997's "South of the Border") and entered the top 40 in several other countries. It was not released in Australia until 2002, when it peaked at number 53 on the ARIA Singles Chart. The music video for the single was presented in animation. It featured a cartoon facsimile of Williams always on the run in search of love. There is a second, raunchier version of the video depicting animated nudity and sex.

== Track listings ==
UK and New Zealand CD single

1. "Let Love Be Your Energy" – 4:57
2. "My Way" (live) – 4:32
3. "Rolling Stone" – 3:30
4. "My Way" (live film)

UK cassette single

1. "Let Love Be Your Energy" – 4:57
2. "My Way" (live) – 4:32
3. "Rolling Stone" – 3:30

European CD single

1. "Let Love Be Your Energy" – 4:57
2. "Rolling Stone" – 3:30

Australian CD single

1. "Let Love Be Your Energy" – 4:57
2. "Eternity" (full length) – 5:02
3. "Toxic" – 3:48
4. "Rolling Stone" – 3:43

== Credits and personnel ==
Credits are taken from the Sing When You're Winning album booklet.

Studios

- Recorded at Master Rock Studios (North London, England) and Sarm Hook End (Reading, England)
- Mixed at Battery Studios (London, England)
- Mastered at Metropolis Mastering (London, England)

Personnel

- Robbie Williams – writing, lead vocals
- Guy Chambers – writing, reverse guitars, all keyboards, Moog solo, production, arrangement
- Dave Catlin-Birch – backing vocals
- Andy Caine – backing vocals
- Steve McEwan – backing vocals
- Gary Nuttall – backing vocals
- Claire Worrall – backing vocals
- Alana Duncan – child's voice
- Neil Taylor – electric guitar
- Phil Spalding – bass guitar
- Fil Eisler – reverse bass
- Chris Sharrock – drums
- Andy Duncan – drum and percussion programming
- Steve Sidwell – piccolo trumpet
- Steve Power – production, mixing
- Richard Flack – Pro Tools
- Tony Cousins – mastering

== Charts ==
=== Weekly charts ===
Chart (2001–2002)	Peak position
Australia (ARIA)	53
Austria (Ö3 Austria Top 40)	54
Croatia (HRT)	7
Europe (Eurochart Hot 100)	33
Europe (European Hit Radio)	15
Germany (GfK)	68
Ireland (IRMA)	26
Italy (FIMI)	50
Italy (Musica e dischi)	47
Latvia (Latvijas Top 30)	14
Netherlands (Dutch Top 40)	21
Netherlands (Single Top 100)	55
New Zealand (Recorded Music NZ)	11
Scottish Singles Sales (Official Charts)	9
Switzerland (Schweizer Hitparade)	56
UK Singles (Official Charts)	10
UK Airplay (Music Week)	9

=== Year-end charts ===
Chart (2001)	Position
Europe (European Hit Radio)	92
UK Singles (OCC)	167

== Release history ==
Region	Date	Format(s)	Label(s)	Ref.
United Kingdom	9 April 2001	CD; cassette	Chrysalis	
Australia	10 June 2002	CD	Chrysalis	
