= Kids (Robbie Williams and Kylie Minogue song) =

2000 single by Robbie Williams and Kylie Minogue

Single by Robbie Williams and Kylie Minogue

from the album Sing When You're Winning and Light Years
- B-side: "John's Gay"; "Often"; "Karaoke Star"; "Kill Me or Cure Me"
- Released: 9 October 2000
- Studio: Master Rock (North London, England); Sarm Hook End (Reading, England)
- Genre: Rock; dance-rock; pop
- Length: 4:47 (album version); 4:19 (radio edit)
- Label: Chrysalis
- Songwriters: Robert Williams; Guy Chambers
- Producers: Guy Chambers; Steve Power

Robbie Williams singles chronology
"Rock DJ" (2000)	"Kids" (2000)	"Supreme" (2000)

Kylie Minogue singles chronology
"On a Night Like This" (2000)	"Kids" (2000)	"Please Stay" (2000)

Music video
- "Kids" on YouTube

"Kids" is a duet by English singer Robbie Williams and Australian singer Kylie Minogue. It was released on 9 October 2000 as the second single from Williams' third studio album, Sing When You're Winning, and the third single from Minogue's seventh studio album, Light Years.

Williams and his then-songwriting partner Guy Chambers co-wrote the song for Minogue after she approached Williams to write her some songs for her first album under Parlophone, Light Years. Feeling the chemistry between both himself and Minogue, he decided to turn the song into a duet, include the track on his album, and release it as a single. His rap verse on the song comparing himself to Sean Connery and including the line "Press be asking do I care for sodomy/I don't know/Yeah, probably" was entirely removed for radio play and the version on Minogue's album.

Minogue and Williams re-recorded "Kids" with an updated, funkier arrangement for Williams' compilation album, XXV, released on 9 September 2022.

== Chart performance ==
The song became a hit in the United Kingdom, reaching number two and selling over 200,000 copies to earn a silver certification from the BPI. In 2025, it was certified gold for reaching 400,000 certified units since 2004. The track also entered the top 10 in Hungary, Iceland, Ireland, New Zealand, and Portugal, and peaked at number 14 in Kylie Minogue's native Australia, where it was certified gold for shipments of over 35,000 copies. The lyrics, although penned by Robbie Williams and Guy Chambers, make numerous references to the careers of both Minogue and Williams. Minogue's lyric "I've been dropping beats since Back in Black" self-deprecatingly refers to her 1980s pop image when she was known as the singing budgie from Australia (Back in Black being a 1980s album by Australian band AC/DC, which starkly contrasted with her own style at the time). Later, in 2010, this song was used as the theme song of Junior Masterchef Australia.

== Music video ==
The music video for the song contains several references to the musical film Grease, particularly in the choreography between Williams and Minogue.

== Track listings ==
Australian CD1

1. "Kids" – 4:47
2. "John's Gay" – 3:40
3. "Often" – 2:46
4. "Rock DJ" (video)

Australian CD2

1. "Kids" – 4:47
2. "Karaoke Star" – 4:10
3. "Kill Me or Cure Me" – 2:14
4. "Kids" (video)

European CD single

1. "Kids" – 4:47
2. "John's Gay" – 3:40
3. "Kids" (video)

UK CD1

1. "Kids" – 4:47
2. "John's Gay" – 3:40
3. "Often" – 2:46
4. "Kids" (video)

UK CD2

1. "Kids" – 4:47
2. "Karaoke Star" – 4:10
3. "Kill Me or Cure Me" – 2:14

UK cassette single

1. "Kids" – 4:47
2. "John's Gay" – 3:40
3. "Often" – 2:46

== Credits and personnel ==
Credits are taken from the Sing When You're Winning album booklet.

Studios

- Recorded at Master Rock Studios (North London, England) and Sarm Hook End (Reading, England)
- Mixed at Battery Studios (London, England)
- Mastered at Metropolis Mastering (London, England)

Personnel

- Robbie Williams – writing, lead vocals
- Guy Chambers – writing, all keyboards, production, arrangement
- Kylie Minogue – lead vocals
- Gary Nuttall – backing vocals
- Katie Kissoon – backing vocals
- Sylvia Mason-James – backing vocals
- Tessa Niles – backing vocals
- Paul "Tubbs" Williams – backing vocals
- Claire Worrall – backing vocals
- Neil Taylor – guitars
- Winston Blissett – bass guitar
- Phil Spalding – fuzz bass
- Andy Duncan – drum programming
- Chris Sharrock – percussion
- Steve Power – production, mixing
- Richard Flack – Pro Tools
- Jim Brumby – Pro Tools
- Tony Cousins – mastering

== Charts ==
=== Weekly charts ===
Chart (2000)	Peak position
Australia (ARIA)	14
Belgium (Ultratop 50 Flanders)	38
Belgium (Ultratip Bubbling Under Wallonia)	10
Croatia International Airplay (HRT)	3
Europe (Eurochart Hot 100)	11
Europe (European Hit Radio)	11
Germany (GfK)	47
Hungary (Mahasz)	8
Iceland (Íslenski Listinn Topp 40)	3
Ireland (IRMA)	9
Italy (FIMI)	29
Italy (Musica e dischi)	26
Latvia (Latvijas Top 30)	10
Netherlands (Dutch Top 40)	11
Netherlands (Single Top 100)	24
New Zealand (Recorded Music NZ)	5
Portugal (AFP)	10
Scottish Singles Sales (Official Charts)	2
Spain Airplay (Top 40 Radio)	10
Sweden (Sverigetopplistan)	31
Switzerland (Schweizer Hitparade)	35
UK Singles (Official Charts)	2
UK Airplay (Music Week)	3

=== Year-end charts ===
Chart (2000)	Position
Europe (European Hit Radio)	96
Ireland (IRMA)	90
UK Singles (OCC)	76

== Certifications ==
Region	Certification	Certified units/sales
Australia (ARIA)	Gold	35,000^{^}
United Kingdom (BPI)	Gold	400,000^{‡}
^{^} Shipments figures based on certification alone.^{‡} Sales+streaming figures based on certification alone.

== Release history ==
Region	Date	Format(s)	Label(s)	Ref.
United Kingdom	9 October 2000	CD; cassette	Chrysalis	
Australia	30 October 2000	CD	Chrysalis	
