= Laura Critchley =

English singer and songwriter

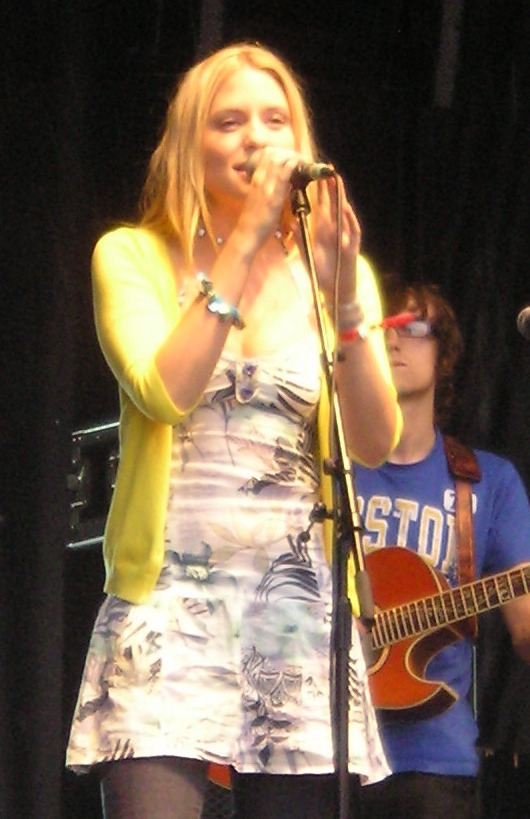
Critchley performing in 2007

Laura Critchley (born 27 March 1984) is an English singer and songwriter. She released her debut album, Sometimes I, in 2007 and has toured with several artists. Critchley has recorded music with Robbie Williams, performed a duet with Ronan Keating, and worked as a backing singer for Tom Jones. In addition to her music career, she has been involved in charity work.

== Biography ==
Laura Critchley was born in Little Sutton, Ellesmere Port, Cheshire.With a voice described as that from a love child of Rod Stewart and Stevie Nicks, Critchley started singing when she was seven years old. She wrote her first song, "Change", at the age of 16. It received radio play on BBC Radio Merseyside on the Billy Butler and Jimmy McCracken show. She got to the last 50 in Fame Academy in 2001, and appeared as Jessica Simpson on Stars in Their Eyes.

In 2006, she moved to London, and within three months was signed to independent record label, Big Print Records, owned and run by Andrew Gemmell and Jeremy Marsh (RCA Telstar). She toured with the Sugababes in March 2007, Ray Quinn in October 2007, Deacon Blue in November 2007, and Boyzone in May 2008.

Critchley's début album, Sometimes I, was released on 19 November 2007. Radio 2's Terry Wogan praised Critchley, saying that her single was excellent, and that she was one to look out for.

The same year, she recorded three songs with Robbie Williams. In December she sang at Ronan Keating's cancer research ball, and also duetted with him on a version of "Last Thing on My Mind".

Her first single, "Sometimes I" was released on 21 May 2007. Produced by Steve Power, the man who worked on many of Williams' hits with him, the single did not chart, but did well on the video channels. The second single, "What Do We Do", was on the Radio 2 playlist on the Wogan show, and was released on 12 November 2007. Her third single was a remix of "Sometimes I", by Ash Howes (who has worked with Girls Aloud and the Sugababes), was released on 25 February 2008. Critchley's fourth single, "Today's Another Day", was released on 16 June 2008 and was a radio hit, reaching number 4 in the independent charts. On 6 July 2009, Critchley released her single "Feel Proud", which she wrote with British soldiers in mind. Profits went to the Help For Heroes charity. Critchley's songs have been on the Radio 2 playlists, as well as many regional stations, such as Radio Ulster.

Critchley won the best live performance award at the Irish Entertainment Awards in October 2008. She performed her debut American showcase on 1 May 2008, attended by many record company executives. Jeff Arch, writer of the film Sleepless in Seattle, also directed her video for the single "Today's Another Day".

A 10-part series for the Discovery Channel, Kenwood Glamour Puds has used Critchley's music as the title music and sound beds. Glamour Puds, featuring Critchley's music, has since been shown on Channel 4 on daytime TV. In 2010, Critchley was picked by Tom Jones to be one of his two backing singers during his worldwide performances and promotion of his album Praise and Blame. She appeared on Good Morning America, as well as many other shows around the world, with Jones.

== Other work ==
Critchley was chosen as the face of the new airline Fly Pink. She is a patron of autism charity Wishing Well House. Screenwriter Jeff Arch wrote a scene for Critchley in his film The Chelsea Story, which was set to star John Cusack and Naomi Watts. He has since also asked her to write the title track for the film. Critchley accepted a request from the Duchess of York to be one of her Children in Crisis charity's celebrity ambassadors for 2008.

== Discography ==
"Sometimes I" is the second single by Critchley, which launched her music career from her MySpace page. Released on 21 May 2007, it was produced by Steve Power.

A re-mix of the song was released as Critchley's fourth single on 25 February 2008.

=== Albums ===
- Sometimes I – (19 November 2007)

=== Singles ===
from Sometimes I

- "Don't Say" – (26 March 2007)
- "Sometimes I" – (21 May 2007)
- "What Do We Do" – (12 November 2007)
- "Sometimes I" (re-mix) – (25 February 2008)
- "Today's Another Day" – (16 June 2008)

non-album single

- "Feel Proud" – (6 July 2009)
