= Paul M. Smith (photographer) =

British photographer and academic

Paul M. Smith (born 1969) is a British photographer and educator. Deputy Head of School, Media and Performing Arts. BA Photography course within Coventry University Department of Media. In 2001 he was the recipient of the Vic Odden Award from the Royal Photographic Society. MBA and DBA Coventry University.

== Life and work ==
According to Smith's Coventry University profile, he:

originally studied Fine Art [between 1991 and 1995] at Coventry University and as part of his course he undertook a research project into contemporary art which included living on an Aboriginal reserve for four months. After completing his degree at Coventry he completed a Master's degree in Photography at the Royal College of Art. During this time he examined the meaning and construction of masculinity, concentrating on the cultural and visual creation of various alpha male identities.

His work scrutinises various forms of heroic behaviour. Smith has travelled from 'Soldier' via 'Action Hero' to arrive in his current body of work, the forensic vision of death presented as a new series called 'Impact'.

"Smith's commissioned work includes pieces for Channel 4, Mattersons, and the CD cover for Robbie Williams' Sing When You're Winning."

== Publications ==
In 2004 Goliath published Paul M Smith, Photographs, including work from 1997 to 2004.

Smith's work also appears in Digital Art published by Thames and Hudson, Blink; Phaidon, Porn?; Vision On, and I Am A Camera, and The Saatchi Gallery; Booth-Clibborn.

== Awards ==
- 2001: Vic Odden Award from the Royal Photographic Society, Bath
