= Sexed Up =

2003 single by Robbie Williams

Single by Robbie Williams

from the album Escapology
- B-side: "Get a Little High"; "Appliance of Science"; "Big Beef"
- Released: 3 November 2003
- Genre: Soft rock
- Length: 4:19 (album version); 4:10 (radio mix)
- Label: Chrysalis
- Songwriters: Robbie Williams; Guy Chambers
- Producers: Guy Chambers; Steve Power

Robbie Williams singles chronology
| "Something Beautiful" (2003) | "Sexed Up" (2003) | "Radio" (2004) |

Music video
- "Sexed Up" on YouTube

"Sexed Up" is a song by British pop singer Robbie Williams, released as the fourth and final single from his fifth studio album, Escapology, in November 2003. It was originally recorded for Natalie Imbruglia, who turned it down. Williams had earlier released it in 1998 in demo form as the B-side to his single "No Regrets".

There are two versions of the song, the album/single version and an unplugged version. The unplugged version has one different lyric line ("I'll lay a bet/that I'm okay" instead of "I can't awaken the dead/day after day" on the first verse) and the guitar solo before the bridge is one measure longer.

== Chart performance ==
The single became another top-ten hit for Robbie Williams in the United Kingdom when it was released in November that year, peaking at number 10, and it reached the top 20 in Australia, Denmark, Ireland, Italy and the Netherlands. The single received a special limited release in Australia and New Zealand featuring a bonus live track, special packing and a bonus fold-out poster.

== Music video ==
The music video was directed by Jonas Åkerlund and features the actress Jaime King.

== Track listings ==
UK CD single

1. "Sexed Up" – 4:19
2. "Get a Little High" – 3:55
3. "Appliance of Science" – 4:52
4. Trailer
5. Photo gallery

UK DVD single

1. "Sexed Up" (video) – 4:06
2. "Appliance of Science" (audio) – 4:52
3. "Big Beef" (audio) – 3:40
4. Trailer
5. Photo gallery

European CD single

1. "Sexed Up" – 4:19
2. "Get a Little High" – 3:55

Australian and New Zealand CD single

1. "Sexed Up" – 4:19
2. "Get a Little High" – 3:55
3. "Appliance of Science" – 4:52
4. "Rock DJ" (live at Knebworth)
5. Trailer
6. Photo gallery

== Credits and personnel ==
Credits are taken from the Escapology album booklet.

Recording

- Recorded in Los Angeles and London
- Mixed at The Record Plant (Los Angeles)
- Mastered at Marcussen Mastering (Los Angeles)

Personnel

- Robbie Williams – writing, lead vocals
- Guy Chambers – writing, piano, production, arrangement
- Gary Nuttall – acoustic guitar
- Neil Taylor – electric guitar
- Melvin Duffy – pedal steel guitar
- Phil Spalding – bass
- Jeremy Stacey – drums
- Luís Jardim – percussion
- The London Session Orchestra – orchestra
- Gavyn Wright – concertmaster
- Sally Herbert – orchestral arrangement
- Steve Price – orchestral engineering
- Tom Jenkins – assistant orchestral engineering
- Isobel Griffiths – orchestral contracting
- Jim Brumby – programming, additional engineering
- Steve Power – production, mixing
- J.D. Andrew – assistant mixing
- Richard Flack – engineering, programming
- Steve Marcussen – mastering

== Charts ==
=== Weekly charts ===
| Chart (2003–2004) | Peak position |
|---|---|
| Australia (ARIA) | 17 |
| Austria (Ö3 Austria Top 40) | 45 |
| Belgium (Ultratip Bubbling Under Flanders) | 4 |
| Belgium (Ultratip Bubbling Under Wallonia) | 12 |
| CIS Airplay (TopHit) | 70 |
| Croatia (HRT) | 6 |
| Denmark (Tracklisten) | 9 |
| Europe (Eurochart Hot 100) | 26 |
| Europe (European Hit Radio) | 6 |
| Finland Airplay (Radiosoittolista) | 7 |
| Germany (GfK) | 53 |
| Hungary (Single Top 40) | 5 |
| Ireland (IRMA) | 18 |
| Italy (FIMI) | 8 |
| Italy (Musica e dischi) | 5 |
| Netherlands (Dutch Top 40) | 12 |
| Netherlands (Single Top 100) | 33 |
| New Zealand (Recorded Music NZ) | 25 |
| Romania (Romanian Top 100) | 31 |
| Russia Airplay (TopHit) | 49 |
| Scottish Singles Sales (Official Charts) | 10 |
| Switzerland (Schweizer Hitparade) | 59 |
| UK Singles (Official Charts) | 10 |
| UK Airplay (Music Week) | 3 |

=== Year-end charts ===
| Chart (2003) | Position |
|---|---|
| Brazil (Crowley) | 8 |
| CIS Airplay (TopHit) | 117 |
| Netherlands (Dutch Top 40) | 82 |
| Russia Airplay (TopHit) | 89 |
| UK Airplay (Music Week) | 62 |

== Release history ==
| Region | Date | Format(s) | Label(s) | Ref. |
|---|---|---|---|---|
| United Kingdom | 3 November 2003 | CD; DVD | Chrysalis | |
| Australia | 1 December 2003 | CD | Chrysalis | |
