= Better Man (Robbie Williams song) =

2001 song by Robbie Williams

Single by Robbie Williams

from the album Sing When You're Winning
- B-side: "My Way" (live); "Rolling Stone"; "Toxic"
- Released: 22 October 2001
- Studio: Master Rock (North London, England); Sarm Hook End (Reading, England)
- Length: 3:22
- Label: EMI, Chrysalis
- Songwriters: Guy Chambers, Robbie Williams
- Producers: Guy Chambers, Steve Power

Robbie Williams singles chronology
"Eternity" / "The Road to Mandalay" (2001)	"Better Man" (2001)	"Somethin' Stupid" (2001)

Audio video
- "Better Man" on YouTube

"Better Man" is a song by English pop singer Robbie Williams, released as the final single from his third studio album, Sing When You're Winning (2000), in October 2001. It was released only in Australia, New Zealand and Latin America. A music video for the Australian release was produced in 2001, reusing scenes from Williams' "Eternity" music video since that single was not released there. The video is intercut with a live performance of "Better Man" from his The Sermon on the Mount Tour in Manchester, England, in October 2000, overdubbed with the studio version. The song's title would later go on to serve as the title of Williams' 2024 biopic.

== Spanish version ==
Robbie Williams recorded a Spanish version of the song called "Ser mejor" ("To Be Better"). It was included on the Latin American pressings of Sing When You're Winning.

== Release and success ==
In New Zealand, "Better Man" began receiving airplay in late 2000. It eventually peaked at number four on the RIANZ Singles Chart for four weeks in December 2000 and January 2001. The promotional disc of "Ser mejor" was sent to Latin American radio stations in 2001. In Australia, "Better Man" was released as a CD single on 22 October 2001. It appeared on the ARIA Singles Chart the following week, climbing to number eight during its ninth week on the chart and reaching its peak of number six on 20 January 2002, spending four nonconsecutive weeks at that position and remaining in the top 50 for 29 weeks. It sold over 35,000 copies, earning a gold certification from the Australian Recording Industry Association (ARIA).

== Track listing ==
Australian CD single

1. "Better Man" – 3:24
2. "My Way" (live) – 4:35
3. "Rolling Stone" – 3:43
4. "Toxic" – 3:51
5. "Let Love Be Your Energy" (video) – 4:18

== Credits and personnel ==
Credits are taken from the Sing When You're Winning album booklet.

Studios

- Recorded at Master Rock Studios (North London, England) and Sarm Hook End (Reading, England)
- Mixed at Battery Studios (London, England)
- Mastered at Metropolis Mastering (London, England)

Personnel

- Robbie Williams – writing, lead vocals
- Guy Chambers – writing, piano, orchestration, production, arrangement
- Dave Catlin-Birch – backing vocals, bass guitar
- Steve McEwan – backing vocals
- Gary Nuttall – backing vocals
- Phil Palmer – 12-string guitar
- Neil Taylor – electric guitars
- Chris Sharrock – drums
- Andy Duncan – percussion
- The London Session Orchestra – orchestra
- Gavyn Wright – concertmaster
- Nick Ingman – orchestration
- Isobel Griffiths – orchestral contractor
- Steve Price – orchestral engineering
- Steve Power – production, mixing, Pro Tools
- Richard Flack – Pro Tools
- Tony Cousins – mastering

== Charts ==
=== Weekly charts ===
Chart (2000–2002)	Peak position
Australia (ARIA)	6
New Zealand (Recorded Music NZ)	4

=== Year-end charts ===
Chart (2000)	Position
Taiwan (Hito Radio)	31

Chart (2001)	Position
Australia (ARIA)	94
Taiwan (Hito Radio)	25

Chart (2002)	Position
Australia (ARIA)	31

== Certifications ==
Region	Certification	Certified units/sales
Australia (ARIA)	Gold	35,000^{^}
New Zealand (RMNZ)	Gold	15,000^{‡}
^{^} Shipments figures based on certification alone.^{‡} Sales+streaming figures based on certification alone.
