= Stress (British band) =

British rock band

Stress was a short-lived British neo-psychedelic rock band composed of Wayne Binitie, Ian Mussington and Mitch Amachi Ogugua. They released only one album in 1991 on Reprise/Warner Bros. Records. They are not to be confused with the San Diego rock band Stress and are sometimes credited as Stress UK in the United States. A live performance in Hollywood drew a mixed review from the Los Angeles Times, with the band's sound described as "likable but relaxed grooves", though a generally more positive review was published the following month in the Washington Post.

Their album drew numerous favourable comparisons with the likes of Jimi Hendrix and The Beatles, and although not a great commercial success, was described as possessing 'a lot of musical strengths' by AllMusic's Steven McDonald. In November 2021 the album was featured in an article on WhatCulture, 10 Forgotten Rock Albums That Need To Be Heard.

In 1997, Binitie and Ogugua released a second album under the moniker of Inqbator, entitled "Hatched". It featured contributions from Lenny Kravitz, whom they had previously supported on tour.

== Album ==
The eponymously titled Stress album featured the following tracks, all composed by Binitie/Mussington/Ogugua:

1. "Indian Summer's Dream" 4:20
2. "Flowers in the Rain" 4:16
3. "Rosechild" 4:16
4. "Innocent World" 3:20
5. "Daytime Believer" 5:34
6. "Beautiful People" 4:14
7. "My Father Once Said" 2:29
8. "Together" 3:35
9. "Lordy Lord" 4:08
10. "Red Sun" 7:35

== Additional tracks ==
- "Leather Trouser Blues" 3:58 - "Beautiful People" B-side
- "Flowers in the Rain" (Blood Pressure mix) 4:53 - by Coldcut
- "Flowers in the Rain" (Blood Pressure instrumental) a.k.a. International Blood Pressure mix
- "Flowers in the Rain" (without intro) 3:57
- "Beautiful People" (Beautiful Breakdown mix/edit) 6:00/4:22 - by Matt Budd/Steve Sidelnyk
- "Beautiful People" (Bud Dub mix) 5:55 - by Matt Budd
- "Beautiful People" (Bruce Forest mix/edit) 8:02/5:54
- "Beautiful People" (Underground mix) 7:15

== Album personnel ==
- Wayne Binitie: lead and background vocals, acoustic guitar
- Mitch Amachi Ogugua: bass, acoustic guitar
- Ian Mussington: drums
- Guy Chambers: guitar, keyboards, producer, arranger
- Simon Stewart: guitar, background vocals
- Alex Mungo: keyboards, background vocals
- Jean Perry: guitar
- Steve Byrd: guitar
- Billy McGee: double bass
- Talvin Singh: tabla
- Raf Mizraki: various Turkish instruments
- Harry Morgan: percussion
- 'False Harmonies': strings
- Claudia Fontaine: background vocals
- Claudia Sarne: background vocals
- Martyn Taylor: background vocals
- Femi Jiya: engineer, No. 2, 3, 6, 9, 10
- Steve Price: engineer, No. 7
- Peter Jones: engineer, No. 1, 4, 5, 8; mixer No. 2, 3, 5, 8, 9
- Julian Mendelsohn: mixer, No. 1, 5, 6
- Michael Brauer: mixer, No. 2, 4, 8, 10
- Bob Kraushaar: mixer, No. 7

== Singles ==
| Year | Title | Chart Positions | | Album |
| Year | Title | US Modern Rock | UK | Album |
| 1990 | "Beautiful People" | — | 74 | Stress |
| 1991 | "Flowers in the Rain" | 7 | — | Stress |

In 1991, "Rosechild" was released as a third single in the UK, but met with no commercial success.
