= Sing When You're Winning =

Studio album by Robbie Williams
- Released: 28 August 2000
- Recorded: 1999–2000
- Studios: Hookend Manor, Oxfordshire and Master Rock Studios, London
- Genre: Dance-pop
- Length: 75:58
- Labels: Chrysalis; Capitol
- Producers: Guy Chambers; Steve Power

Robbie Williams chronology
The Ego Has Landed (1999)	Sing When You're Winning (2000)	Swing When You're Winning (2001)

Singles from Sing When You're Winning
- 1. "Rock DJ" Released: 31 July 2000; 2. "Kids" Released: 9 October 2000; 3. "Supreme" Released: 11 December 2000; 4. "Let Love Be Your Energy" Released: 9 April 2001; 5. "Eternity"/"The Road to Mandalay" Released: 9 July 2001; 6. "Better Man" Released: 22 October 2001

Sing When You're Winning is the third studio album by English singer-songwriter Robbie Williams. It was released on 28 August 2000 in the United Kingdom by Chrysalis UK and in the United States by Chrysalis Records USA and Capitol Records. Following the critical and commercial success of I've Been Expecting You (1998), the North American release of The Ego Has Landed (1999) and the subsequent promotional tours for both albums, Williams reteamed with producers Guy Chambers and Steve Power to create new material for his next record. Whereas I've Been Expecting You used the Britpop genre for its overall sound, Sing When You're Winning incorporates a more post-millennial dance-pop approach while utilizing classic British rock elements.

The album garnered positive reviews from critics. Sing When You're Winning debuted at number one in the UK, Germany, Ireland and New Zealand, as well as the top 10 in countries like Australia, Finland, Sweden and Switzerland. It spawned six singles: "Rock DJ", "Kids" (with Kylie Minogue), "Supreme", "Let Love Be Your Energy", "Eternity"/"The Road to Mandalay" and "Better Man".

== Background and content ==
Following the 1998 release of his album I've Been Expecting You, and in the middle of promotion and touring in 1999, Williams found time to start the work on what would be his third studio album.

The sound of the album was described as seeing Williams move "farther away from the increasingly dated visions of Oasis-style Britpop to embrace post-millennial dance-pop, complete with the bruising beats and extroverted productions to match." The album features a variety of styles, "conjuring a panoply of classic British rock touchstones like psychedelia, slick country rock, Ian Dury, the Who, Elton John, and Madchester."

The album's title is a reference to a popular football chant of the same name that goes to the tune of "Guantanamera", Williams being a fan of Port Vale. The cover art features multiple images of Williams celebrating winning a trophy at Chelsea's stadium Stamford Bridge.

Initial releases do not feature Williams' name or the album title on the front cover, nor is there a track listing featured on the back cover; these were all changed for future releases. The images were taken by photographer Paul M. Smith and, along with Williams' complete football strip, were later sold at auction to raise money for his charity Give It Sum. Williams toured the United Kingdom with Kylie Minogue in October and November 2000 to promote the album, selling out in every venue.

The album contains a hidden message included for humorous effect. After 24 minutes of silence following track 12, "The Road to Mandalay", a spoken message from Williams saying "No, I'm not doing one on this album" is heard, indicating that there is no hidden track on the album. This is a reference to Williams' previous three albums (including the compilation The Ego Has Landed), each of which contained hidden tracks at the end.

== Commercial reception ==
When the album was released on 28 August 2000, it immediately became a hit in the United Kingdom, debuting at number-one and being certified 2× Platinum in the first week of release. The album also topped the charts in New Zealand, Ireland and Germany, and secured top ten placings in Argentina, Austria, Australia, Finland, Mexico, Sweden, Switzerland. Sing When You're Winning failed to reach the top 20 in Spain, reaching number 22. The album spent 91 weeks on the UK chart, going on to sell 2.4 million copies in the UK alone, being certified 8× Platinum by the BPI. The album became the best-selling album of 2000 in the UK, and the 51st-best-selling album in UK music history. The album found little success in the United States, however, peaking at 110 in the Billboard 200.

== Critical reception ==
Professional ratings
Aggregate scores
Source	Rating
Metacritic	69/100
Review scores
Source	Rating
AllMusic	4/5 stars
Alternative Press	4/5
Entertainment Weekly	A−
The Guardian	3/5 stars
The Independent	3/5 stars
Melody Maker	3.5/5 stars
NME	2.5/5 stars
Q	4/5 stars
Rolling Stone	3.5/5 stars
Spin	5/10

Initial critical response to Sing When You're Winning was positive. From Metacritic, which assigns a normalised rating out of 100 to reviews from mainstream critics, the album received an average score of 69, based on 11 reviews.

== Singles ==
- "Rock DJ" was released as the album's first single. The song was inspired by Williams' UNICEF mentor, the late Ian Dury. The video was censored by Top of the Pops for its gore content, with many other channels following suit. Controversy ensued in the United Kingdom and many other countries, with the video showing Williams tearing chunks of skin and muscle from his body while performing a strip show, in an attempt to get noticed by a group of women. The track became an instant hit around the globe, hitting number one in the United Kingdom, becoming his third number-one single as a solo artist and exactly a year after his sell-out concert at Slane Castle. The song also reached number-one in Ireland, New Zealand, Mexico and Argentina and hit top-ten placings across Europe, Australasia and Latin America. Despite its worldwide success the song failed to break into the United States charts, although it did get some TV airplay on MTV and VH1. The song went on to win several awards including "Best Song of 2000" at the MTV Europe Music Awards, "Best Single of the Year" at the Brit Awards and an MTV Video Music Award for Best Special Effects. It went on to sell over 600,000 copies in the UK alone, and was certified Platinum by the BPI.
- "Kids", a collaboration with Australian pop icon Kylie Minogue, was released as the album's second single. The track was written when Minogue approached Williams to write some songs for her debut Parlophone album Light Years. Williams decided to include the track on his album and released it as a single, becoming an instant hit upon release in October of that year. The song hit number two in the United Kingdom and snared top 10 placings in Australia, New Zealand, Latvia, Mexico and several other countries. One of the biggest hits of 2000, "Kids" sold over 200,000 copies in the UK alone and was certified Silver.
- "Supreme" was released as the album's third single, and was promoted in various countries by several international-language versions, including versions of the song in French and Spanish.
- "Let Love Be Your Energy" was released as the album's fourth single, and was the first Robbie Williams music video not to feature Williams himself. Instead, the video was animated and featured Williams attempting to outrun a volcano.
- "Eternity", a track that was not featured on the album, was released in the summer of 2001 backed with "The Road to Mandalay", a song which appears as the final track from the album. "Eternity" was written by Williams in what he called "the most amazing summer ever". After years of non-stop work he took a month off and recorded this track, which became his fourth number-one single in the United Kingdom, selling over 70,000 copies in its first week. It also became a top ten hit all over Europe.
- "Better Man" was released as the album's sixth and final single, exclusively in Australia and New Zealand. The single was released to relative success there.

== Track listing ==
- All the tracks produced by Guy Chambers and Steve Power.

No.	Title	Writer(s)	Length
1.	"Let Love Be Your Energy"	Robbie Williams; Guy Chambers	4:59
2.	"Better Man"	Williams; Chambers	3:22
3.	"Rock DJ"	Williams; Chambers; Kelvin Andrews; Nelson Pigford; Ekundayo Paris	4:18
4.	"Supreme"	Williams; Chambers; Freddie Perren; Dino Fekaris	4:18
5.	"Kids" (with Kylie Minogue)	Williams; Chambers	4:46
6.	"If It's Hurting You"	Williams; Chambers	4:10
7.	"Singing for the Lonely"	Williams; Chambers	4:31
8.	"Love Calling Earth"	Williams; Chambers; Andrews	4:05
9.	"Knutsford City Limits"	Williams; Chambers; Andrews	4:45
10.	"Forever Texas"	Williams; Chambers	3:37
11.	"By All Means Necessary"	Williams; Chambers	4:45
12.	"The Road to Mandalay" (the song ends at 3:57, and includes the outro hidden track, which begins at 28:09)	Williams; Chambers	28:16

Collector's edition bonus tracks
No.	Title	Writer(s)	Length
14.	"Often" (Live in Manchester)	Williams, Chambers	3:57
15.	"Better Man" (Live in Manchester) (video)	Williams, Chambers	4:43
16.	"Phoenix from the Flames" (Live in Manchester) (video)	Williams, Chambers	4:18

Mainland Europe bonus track
No.	Title	Writer(s)	Length
14.	"Suprême"	Williams, Chambers	4:22

Latin America and Canada bonus tracks
No.	Title	Writer(s)	Length
14.	"Suprême"	Williams, Chambers	4:22
15.	"Ser Mejor"	Williams, Chambers	3:17 (24:19 on music services)

Mainland America bonus track
No.	Title	Writer(s)	Length
14.	"Rock DJ" (music video)	Williams, Chambers	4:22

Special edition bonus DVD
No.	Title	Length
1.	"Rock DJ" (Live on TOTP)
2.	"Kids" (Live on TOTP)
3.	"Kids" (Live at the MTV Music Awards)
4.	"Let Love Be Your Energy" (Live on Later... with Jools Holland)
5.	"Better Man" (Live on Later... with Jools Holland)
6.	"Supreme" (Live on TOTP)
7.	"Michael Parkinson Interview"
8.	"Eternity" (Live on TOTP)
9.	"The Road to Mandalay" (Live on TOTP)

== Personnel ==
Adapted from the album's liner notes.

Vocals

- Robbie Williams – vocals (all tracks), backing vocals (7)
- Kylie Minogue – vocals (5)
- Crystal Adams – backing vocals (4)
- Andre Barreau – backing vocals (7)
- Andy Caine – backing vocals (1, 3, 8, 12)
- Dave Catlin-Birch – backing vocals (1, 2, 7)
- Guy Chambers – backing vocals (12)
- Derek Green – backing vocals (3)
- Marielle Hervé – backing vocals (4)
- Katie Kissoon – backing vocals (3, 5)
- Sylvia Mason-James – backing vocals (3, 5, 10)
- Steve McEwan – backing vocals (1, 2, 7, 12)
- Tessa Niles – backing vocals (3, 5, 10)
- Gary Nuttall – backing vocals (1, 2, 5–7, 10, 11)
- Pauline Taylor – backing vocals (9)
- Claire Worrall – backing vocals (1, 5, 7, 9–11)

Instrumentation

- Dave Bishop – saxophone (3)
- Winston Blissett – bass guitar (3, 9)
- Pauline Boeykens – tuba (12)
- Dave Catlin-Birch – bass guitar (2, 6, 7, 11, 12), 12-string electric guitar (7)
- Guy Chambers – keyboards, guitar, piano (2, 6, 12), synthesizer, organ (12), clavinet (12), omnichord (12)
- Pete Davies – keyboards (9)
- Alex Dickson – electric guitar (10), autoharp (12)
- Melvin Duffy – pedal steel guitar (6, 12)
- Andy Duncan – percussion (1, 2)
- Fil Eisler – bass guitar (1, 10)
- Mark Feltham – harmonica (10)
- Edgar Herzog – clarinet (12)
- Bob Lanese – trumpet (12)
- Brad Lang – bass guitar, double bass (8)
- Steve McEwan – electric guitar (10)
- Gary Nuttall – electric banjo (6)
- Phil Palmer – acoustic guitar, electric guitar, 12-string guitar (2)
- Steve Power – vocoder (3), glockenspiel (12)
- Chris Sharrock – drums (1, 2, 6, 7, 10, 12), ambient kit (4), percussion (5)
- Neil Sidwell – trombone (3)
- Steve Sidwell – trumpet (3)
- Phil Spalding – bass guitar (1, 4, 5)
- Jeremy Stacey – drums (7, 11)
- Neil Taylor – acoustic guitar (4), electric guitar

Technical

- Guy Chambers – production, arranger, orchestration (2, 11)
- Steve Power – production, mixing
- Jim Brumby – programming, Pro Tools (5, 7, 10, 12)
- Pete Davies – drum programming (9)
- Andy Duncan – drum programming (1, 3–5, 7–10, 12), Pro Tools (12)
- Richard Flack – drum programming (4, 7, 9), Pro Tools (all tracks)
- Nick Ingman – orchestration (1, 3, 4, 8, 11)
- Steve Price – orchestral engineering (2–4, 8, 11)
- Savvas Iossifidis – engineering
- Richard Woodcraft – engineering
- David Naughton – assistant mix engineering
- Tony Cousins – mastering

== Charts ==
=== Weekly charts ===
Chart (2000–05)	Peak position
Argentine Albums (CAPIF)	6
Australian Albums (ARIA)	7
Austrian Albums (Ö3 Austria)	4
Belgian Albums (Ultratop Flanders)	13
Belgian Albums (Ultratop Wallonia)	16
Canadian Albums (Billboard)	17
Danish Albums (Hitlisten)	5
Dutch Albums (Album Top 100)	3
European Albums Chart	2
Finnish Albums (Suomen virallinen lista)	6
French Albums (SNEP)	19
German Albums (Offizielle Top 100)	1
Greek Albums (IFPI)	4
Icelandic Albums (Tónlist)	7
Irish Albums (IRMA)	1
Italian Albums (FIMI)	5
Italian Albums (Musica e dischi)	6
New Zealand Albums (RMNZ)	1
Norwegian Albums (VG-lista)	5
Singapore Albums (SPVA)	5
Spanish Albums (PROMUSICAE)	22
Swedish Albums (Sverigetopplistan)	4
Swiss Albums (Schweizer Hitparade)	2
UK Albums (Official Charts)	1
US Billboard 200	110

=== Year-end charts ===
Chart (2000)	Position
Dutch Albums (Album Top 100)	58
European Albums (Music & Media)	25
German Albums (Offizielle Top 100)	30
New Zealand Albums (RMNZ)	16
Swiss Albums (Schweizer Hitparade)	47
UK Albums (OCC)	2

Chart (2001)	Position
Australian Albums (ARIA)	63
Austrian Albums (Ö3 Austria)	19
Belgian Albums (Ultratop Flanders)	46
Belgian Albums (Ultratop Wallonia)	50
Dutch Albums (Album Top 100)	19
European Albums (Music & Media)	11
French Albums (SNEP)	114
German Albums (Offizielle Top 100)	7
New Zealand Albums (RMNZ)	3
Swedish Albums (Sverigetopplistan)	71
Swiss Albums (Schweizer Hitparade)	31
UK Albums (OCC)	32

Chart (2002)	Position
Australian Albums (ARIA)	26

=== Decade-end charts ===
Chart (2000–09)	Position
UK Albums (OCC)	20

== Certifications and sales ==
Region	Certification	Certified units/sales
Argentina (CAPIF)	2× Platinum	120,000^{^}
Australia (ARIA)	3× Platinum	210,000^{^}
Austria (IFPI Austria)	Gold	25,000^{*}
Belgium (BRMA)	Platinum	50,000^{*}
Canada (Music Canada)	Gold	50,000^{^}
Denmark (IFPI Danmark)	Platinum	50,000^{^}
Finland (Musiikkituottajat)	Gold	21,905
France (SNEP)	Gold	100,000^{*}
Germany (BVMI)	3× Gold	450,000^{^}
Mexico (AMPROFON)	Gold	75,000^{^}
Netherlands (NVPI)	Platinum	80,000^{^}
New Zealand (RMNZ)	7× Platinum	105,000^{^}
Norway (IFPI Norway)	Gold	25,000^{*}
Sweden (GLF)	Platinum	80,000^{^}
United Kingdom (BPI)	8× Platinum	2,400,000^{^}
Summaries
Europe (IFPI)	4× Platinum	4,000,000^{*}
^{*} Sales figures based on certification alone.^{^} Shipments figures based on certification alone.

== See also ==
- List of best-selling albums of the 2000s (decade) in the United Kingdom
