= Strong (Robbie Williams song) =

1999 single by Robbie Williams

Single by Robbie Williams

from the album I've Been Expecting You
- B-side: "Let Me Entertain You" (live); "Happy Song"
- Released: 15 March 1999
- Length: 4:39 (album version); 4:19 (radio edit)
- Label: Chrysalis
- Songwriters: Robbie Williams, Guy Chambers
- Producers: Guy Chambers, Steve Power

Robbie Williams singles chronology
"No Regrets" / "Antmusic" (1998)	"Strong" (1999)	"She's the One" / "It's Only Us" (1999)

Music video
- "Strong" on YouTube

"Strong" is a song by English recording artist Robbie Williams. It was released on 15 March 1999 as the third single from his second studio album, I've Been Expecting You (1998). The song entered the top five in the United Kingdom, peaking at number four on the UK singles chart. One of the single's B-sides is the live version of "Let Me Entertain You" recorded at the 1999 Brit Awards, the performance was included on the single in the enhanced section.

In June 2017, Williams performed at the One Love Manchester benefit concert, in aid of the Manchester Arena bombing victims and as a display of the city's unity against terrorism. Williams opened and closed his set by leading a 55,000-strong terrace chant of the song's chorus, changing the lyrics to "Manchester we're strong, we're strong, we're strong. And we're still singing our songs, our songs, our songs!".

On the final night of Williams's 2003 Knebworth House concerts, 125,000 ticketholders sang Strong to set the world record for Most Karaoke Participants. Williams and his audience held the record until 2009, when 160,000 people sang Friends in Low Places by Garth Brooks whilst in attendance at the 2009 NASCAR Sharpie 500 race.

== Background and release ==
"Strong" was written by Robbie Williams while he was in a hotel in Cologne, Germany. It was inspired by some of his most hardcore fans, who, Williams confessed, "scared the living daylights out of [him]". He said, "I just wanted them to understand I'm not being rude, but I'm feeling a bit scared of everything."

Following its release on 15 March 1999, "Strong" became Williams' seventh top-five single in the United Kingdom, peaking at number four on the UK Singles Chart. The track also reached the top 10 in New Zealand, debuting and peaking at number nine on 30 May 1999.

== Music video ==
The video is a compilation of on-tour footage, including many live performances, Williams with his nephew, Williams on stage with his dad, and Williams messing about.

== Track listings ==
UK CD single

1. "Strong"
2. "Let Me Entertain You" (live at the Brit Awards '99)
3. "Happy Song"
4. "Let Me Entertain You" (live at the Brit Awards '99 video)

UK cassette single

1. "Strong"
2. "Let Me Entertain You" (live at the Brit Awards '99)
3. "Happy Song"

European CD single

1. "Strong"
2. "Let Me Entertain You" (live at the Brit Awards '99)
3. "Let Me Entertain You" (live at the Brit Awards '99 video)

== Credits and personnel ==
Credits are lifted from the I've Been Expecting You album booklet.

Studio

- Mastered at Metropolis Mastering (London, England)

Personnel

- Robbie Williams – writing, vocals
- Guy Chambers – writing, acoustic guitar, electric guitar, keyboards, piano, production, arrangement
- Gary Nuttall – background vocals
- David Catlin-Birch – background vocals, acoustic guitar, bass guitar
- Steve McEwan – background vocals, electric guitar
- Andre Barreau – background vocals
- Fil Eisler – guitar, guitar solos
- Jeremy Stacey – drums
- Andy Duncan – percussion
- Steve Power – production, recording, mixing, programming
- Steve McNichol – programming
- Tony Cousins – mastering

== Charts ==
=== Weekly charts ===
Chart (1999)	Peak position
Belgium (Ultratip Bubbling Under Flanders)	8
Estonia (Eesti Top 20)	15
Europe (Eurochart Hot 100)	15
Europe (European Hit Radio)	2
Finland Airplay (Radiosoittolista)	14
France (SNEP)	99
Germany (GfK)	68
Hungary (Mahasz)	8
Iceland (Íslenski Listinn Topp 40)	7
Ireland (IRMA)	12
Italy Airplay (Music & Media)	9
Netherlands (Single Top 100)	55
New Zealand (Recorded Music NZ)	9
Poland Airplay (Music & Media)	15
Scottish Singles Sales (Official Charts)	4
Spain Airplay (Top 40 Radio)	16
UK Singles (Official Charts)	4
UK Airplay (Music Week)	1

=== Year-end charts ===
Chart (1999)	Position
Europe (European Hit Radio)	27
UK Singles (OCC)	112
UK Airplay (Music Week)	5

== Certifications ==
Region	Certification	Certified units/sales
United Kingdom (BPI)	Silver	200,000^{‡}
^{‡} Sales+streaming figures based on certification alone.

== Cover versions ==
- In 2015, Lower Than Atlantis released a cover of the song on the 2015 reissue of their self-titled album.
