= Rock DJ =

2000 single by Robbie Williams

Single by Robbie Williams

from the album Sing When You're Winning
- B-side: "Talk to Me"
- Released: 31 July 2000
- Studio: Master Rock (North London, England); Sarm Hook End (Reading, England)
- Genre: Dance-pop; Nu-disco
- Length: 4:15
- Label: Chrysalis; Capitol
- Songwriters: Robbie Williams; Guy Chambers; Kelvin Andrews; Nelson Pigford; Ekundayo Paris
- Producers: Guy Chambers; Steve Power

Robbie Williams singles chronology
"Win Some Lose Some" (2000)	"Rock DJ" (2000)	"Kids" (2000)

Music video
- "Rock DJ" on YouTube

"Rock DJ" is a song by English singer and songwriter Robbie Williams, featured on his third studio album, Sing When You're Winning (2000). The song was released on 31 July 2000 as the lead single from the album. It samples Barry White's song "It's Ecstasy When You Lay Down Next to Me", "Can I Kick It?" by A Tribe Called Quest and has a quote from "La Di Da Di" by Slick Rick and Doug E. Fresh. In his 2023 Netflix series, Williams jokingly stated that he was trying to write "Karma Police" and ended up writing "Karma Chameleon".

"Rock DJ" reached number one in Costa Rica, Estonia, Iceland, Ireland, New Zealand, and the United Kingdom whilst reaching the top 10 in 16 other countries. It was the fourth-best-selling song of 2000 in the UK. In the United States, it peaked at number 24 on the Billboard Dance Club Play chart. The music video features Williams trying to impress a female DJ by stripping naked and eventually resorting to removing his skin and muscles, ending up as a skeleton. The song won British Single of the Year, and the video won British Video of the Year at the 2001 Brit Awards.

== Chart performance ==
The song became Robbie Williams' third number-one solo single in the United Kingdom, going on to sell over 1.2 million copies and being certified 2× platinum by the British Phonographic Industry (BPI). The song also became a hit around Europe, charting inside the top 10 in several countries and becoming his first number-one single in New Zealand. The song also became a top-five hit in Australia, where it went on to sell over 70,000 copies, being certified platinum by the Australian Recording Industry Association (ARIA). In the United States, the track reached number 24 on the Billboard Dance Club Play chart. "Rock DJ" was named the Best Song of 2000 at the MTV Europe Music Awards and Best Single and Best Video at the Brit Awards 2001.

== Music videos ==
The accompanying music video for "Rock DJ" was directed by Vaughan Arnell. It was released on 6 July 2000. It begins with Williams dancing on a roller disco with women skating around him. He wants to get the attention of the female DJ (played by Lauren Gold) standing above the stage, so he begins taking off his clothes. She ignores him at first, but after she finally notices he is completely naked, he proceeds with stripping off his skin, muscles and organs, until the only thing left of him are his bones, which is performed by special effects. In the end, the DJ dances with his skeleton. The video ends with the note, "No Robbies were Harmed During the Making of this Video", a jocular take on the "No animals were harmed" note. The skinless Williams also appears on the single's cover art, as well as on the cover of the DVD release of In and Out of Consciousness: Greatest Hits 1990–2010 in 2010.

The video's ending (beginning with Williams taking off his skin) was cut by most music channels around Europe, including VIVA, MCM, The Box and VH1 Europe. However, in the recent years, some of the music channels in Europe (including MTV Classic and VH1 Europe) airs the "studio recording" version of the music video, even on late night, which made the edited version of the music video fall into obscurity. Examples of TV stations that still play the full video are Bulgarian channel MM, former German located channel B.TV (often in daytime) and Canadian channel MusiquePlus, some channels ran the edited video during the day and the unedited one overnight, while The Hits played a version which cut from Williams dancing in his underwear to dancing as a skeleton, filling the gap by repeating previous footage. This is the version that is currently played on channels owned by The Box Plus Network. In 2001, "Rock DJ" won the MTV Video Music Award for Best Special Effects. In 2006, it was voted by viewers as the seventh Most Groundbreaking Video Ever on MTV and in 2007 it was ranked at number 48 on MuchMusic's 50 Most Controversial Videos. The video was banned in Dominican Republic due to allegations of Satanism.

A 'video single' "Rock DJ", containing the music video and a making-of documentary, was released on VHS on 11 September 2000 and DVD on 16 September. The DVD was intended to be released concurrently with the VHS, but was pulled because copies lacked the '15' certification from the British Board of Film Classification due to a printing error, and needed replacing with the new 15-rated copies. The music video also carried a 15 certificate warning when uploaded to Williams' official website. As of March 2001, "Rock DJ" was the biggest-selling music DVD in the United Kingdom to date, selling over 64,000 copies on what was then still a nascent format.

The video has been shown numerous times on Fuse's Pants-Off Dance-Off, despite its gory content. Toward the end of the dancer's dancing/stripping to it when the video is shown in the background like any other, they only show Williams, briefly, ripping and throwing his skin, and dancing in muscle form before cutting to the hostess of the show. The video appears as an instance of the re-use of the motif of "dancing with the dead" in a book about medieval images of death and dying in art and literature. In April and May 2005, Flaunt mistakenly broadcast the uncensored version before the watershed on six occasions, including once at 10:26am, inspiring a complaint to Ofcom from a woman who said the video scared her young daughter. Ofcom reprimanded Flaunt for breaching the Programme Code.

A second video shows Williams in a studio while recording the song.

== Track listings ==
UK CD and cassette single, Australian CD single

1. "Rock DJ" – 4:15
2. "Talk to Me" – 3:28
3. "Rock DJ" (Player One remix) – 5:34

UK DVD single

1. "Rock DJ" (full length video)
2. "Rock DJ" (a short documentary feature)

European CD single

1. "Rock DJ" – 4:15
2. "Talk to Me" – 3:28

European maxi-CD single

1. "Rock DJ" – 4:15
2. "Talk to Me" – 3:28
3. "Rock DJ" (Player One remix) – 5:34
4. "Rock DJ" (video)

== Credits and personnel ==
Credits are taken from the Sing When You're Winning album booklet.

Studios

- Recorded at Master Rock Studios (North London, England) and Sarm Hook End (Reading, England)
- Mixed at Battery Studios (London, England)
- Mastered at Metropolis Mastering (London, England)

Personnel

- Robbie Williams – writing, lead vocals
- Guy Chambers – writing, all keyboards, production, arrangement
- Kelvin Andrews – writing
- Nelson Pigford – writing
- Ekundayo Paris – writing
- Andy Caine – backing vocals
- Derek Green – backing vocals
- Katie Kissoon – backing vocals
- Sylvia Mason-James – backing vocals
- Tessa Niles – backing vocals
- Paul "Tubbs" Williams – backing vocals
- Steve Power – vocoder, production, mixing
- Neil Taylor – electric guitar
- Winston Blissett – bass guitar
- Andy Duncan – drum programming
- Dave Bishop – brass
- Neil Sidwell – brass
- Steve Sidwell – brass
- The London Session Orchestra – orchestra
- Gavyn Wright – concertmaster
- Nick Ingman – orchestration
- Isobel Griffiths – orchestral contractor
- Steve Price – orchestral engineering
- Richard Flack – Pro Tools
- Tony Cousins – mastering

== Charts ==
=== Weekly charts ===
Chart (2000–2001)	Peak position
Australia (ARIA)	4
Austria (Ö3 Austria Top 40)	7
Belgium (Ultratop 50 Flanders)	18
Belgium (Ultratop 50 Wallonia)	16
Canada (BDS)	22
Canada Adult Contemporary (RPM)	48 (Note: "Rock DJ" reached number 48 when RPM ceased publication in November 2000.)
Costa Rica (El Siglo de Torreón)	1
Czech Republic (IFPI)	3
Denmark (IFPI)	7
El Salvador (El Siglo de Torreón)	3
Estonia (Eesti Top 20)	1
Europe (Eurochart Hot 100)	5
Europe (European Hit Radio)	1
Finland (Suomen virallinen lista)	15
Finland Airplay (Radiosoittolista)	4
France (SNEP)	40
Germany (GfK)	9
Guatemala (El Siglo de Torreón)	4
Hungary (Mahasz)	6
Iceland (Íslenski Listinn Topp 40)	1
Ireland (IRMA)	1
Italy (FIMI)	3
Italy (Musica e dischi)	3
Latvia (Latvijas Top 40)	2
Netherlands (Dutch Top 40)	6
Netherlands (Single Top 100)	11
New Zealand (Recorded Music NZ)	1
Norway (VG-lista)	8
Poland Airplay (Music & Media)	18
Poland (PiF PaF)	7
Portugal (AFP)	6
Scottish Singles Sales (Official Charts)	1
Spain (Promusicae)	3
Spain Airplay (Top 40 Radio)	1
Sweden (Sverigetopplistan)	18
Switzerland (Schweizer Hitparade)	9
UK Singles (Official Charts)	1
UK Airplay (Music Week)	1
Uruguay (El Siglo de Torreón)	3
US Dance Club Songs (Billboard)	24

=== Year-end charts ===
Chart (2000)	Position
Australia (ARIA)	21
Belgium (Ultratop 50 Flanders)	94
Belgium (Ultratop 50 Wallonia)	76
Brazil (Crowley)	27
Europe (Eurochart Hot 100)	38
Europe (European Hit Radio)	7
Germany (Media Control)	78
Iceland (Íslenski Listinn Topp 40)	12
Ireland (IRMA)	6
Latvia (Latvijas Top 50)	17
Netherlands (Dutch Top 40)	34
Netherlands (Single Top 100)	70
New Zealand (RIANZ)	21
Switzerland (Schweizer Hitparade)	59
UK Singles (OCC)	5
UK Airplay (Music Week)	8

Chart (2001)	Position
Taiwan (Hito Radio)	63

Chart (2025)	Position
Argentina Anglo Airplay (Monitor Latino)	65

=== Decade-end charts ===
Chart (2000–2009)	Position
UK Singles (OCC)	41

== Certifications ==
Region	Certification	Certified units/sales
Australia (ARIA)	Platinum	70,000^{^}
New Zealand (RMNZ)	2× Platinum	60,000^{‡}
Spain (Promusicae)	Gold	30,000^{‡}
United Kingdom (BPI)	2× Platinum	1,200,000^{‡}
^{^} Shipments figures based on certification alone.^{‡} Sales+streaming figures based on certification alone.

== Release history ==
Region	Date	Format(s)	Label(s)	Ref(s).
Australia	31 July 2000	CD	Chrysalis	
United Kingdom	31 July 2000	CD; cassette	Chrysalis	
United States	22 August 2000	Contemporary hit radio	Capitol	
United States	25 September 2000	Hot adult contemporary; modern adult contemporary radio	Capitol	
United States	17 October 2000	Rhythmic contemporary radio	Capitol	
