= Ian Mussington =

American drummer

Ian Mussington (born May 30, 1967) is a musician, session drummer and percussionist.

He was the former drummer for the Minneapolis band Soul Asylum from 1998 to 2001. He joined the band shortly after Sterling Campbell departed. Mussington toured with the band until he left in the early 2000s to move to Australia. He also worked on Dave Pirner's 2002 solo album, Faces & Names and was a member of the short-lived 1990s band Stress.

He previous has been a member of or done session work for Wyclef Jean, Lenny Kravitz, Misty Oldland, 12 Rounds and others.
