= The Road to Mandalay (song) =

2001 single by Robbie Williams

Single by Robbie Williams

from the album Sing When You're Winning
- A-side: "Eternity"
- B-side: "Toxic"
- Released: 9 July 2001
- Studio: Master Rock (North London, England); Sarm Hook End (Reading, England)
- Length: 3:57; 28:16 (with silence and hidden track)
- Label: Chrysalis
- Songwriters: Robbie Williams; Guy Chambers
- Producers: Guy Chambers; Steve Power

Robbie Williams singles chronology
| "Let Love Be Your Energy" (2001) | "Eternity" / "The Road to Mandalay" (2001) | "Better Man" (2001) |

Music video
- "The Road to Mandalay" on YouTube

"The Road to Mandalay" is a song by English singer-songwriter Robbie Williams, taken from his third studio album, Sing When You're Winning (2000). It was written by Williams along with Guy Chambers, while production was overseen by Chambers and Steve Power. The song was released as the album's fifth single along with the previously unreleased track "Eternity" which does not appear on Sing When You're Winning. Released on 9 July 2001, the double A-side was the 20th-best-selling single of 2001 in the United Kingdom, topping the country's singles chart, and also peaked at number two in Ireland.

== Music videos ==
The video for "The Road to Mandalay" shows Robbie Williams and four friends driving a Jensen FF and a Ford Transit van, alternatively goofing around and scoping out a money transport van and the people who transport the money in Marseille. When the robbery goes down, Williams and his friends dress with masks covering their faces and run into the transport van with a truck. Holding up a sign with the French words "Ouvrez ou je bute le petit" ("Open or I kill the little one"), and showing the dog of one of the drivers, thus showing they know where to find the driver's family, they quickly move the money to their Ford Transit van, then celebrate while driving off. Williams invites his friends to his new plush house, celebrating with plenty of champagne and cake. The video ends with the van nearly running over an elderly lady, and with Williams waking up startled next to his girlfriend (Australian model Lisa Seiffert).

== Track listings ==
UK CD and cassette single

1. "Eternity" – 5:02
2. "The Road to Mandalay" – 3:57
3. "Toxic" – 3:48

European CD single

1. "Eternity" – 5:02
2. "The Road to Mandalay" – 3:57

French CD single

1. "The Road to Mandalay" – 3:57
2. "Eternity" – 5:02

== Credits and personnel ==
Credits are taken from the Sing When You're Winning album booklet.

Studios

- Recorded at Master Rock Studios (North London, England) and Sarm Hook End (Reading, England)
- Mixed at Battery Studios (London, England)
- Mastered at Metropolis Mastering (London, England)

Personnel

- Robbie Williams – writing, lead vocals
- Guy Chambers – writing, backing vocals, piano, organ, Mellotron, clavinet, Omnichord, production, arrangement
- Andy Caine – backing vocals
- Steve McEwan – backing vocals
- Phil Palmer – acoustic and electric guitars
- Dave Catlin-Birch – bass guitar
- Melvin Duffy – pedal steel guitar
- Chris Sharrock – drums
- Andy Duncan – drum programming, Pro Tools
- Bob Lanese – trumpet
- Pauline Boeykens – tuba
- Edgar Herzog – clarinet
- Alex Dickson – autoharp
- Steve Power – glockenspiel, production, mixing
- Richard Flack – Pro Tools
- Jim Brumby – Pro Tools
- Tony Cousins – mastering

== Charts ==
=== Weekly charts ===
Weekly chart performance for "The Road to Mandalay"
| Chart (2001) | Peak position |
|---|---|
| Austria (Ö3 Austria Top 40) | 9 |
| Belgium (Ultratop 50 Flanders) | 6 |
| Belgium (Ultratop 50 Wallonia) | 9 |
| Denmark (Tracklisten) | 3 |
| Europe (Eurochart Hot 100) | 5 |
| France (SNEP) | 45 |
| Germany (GfK) | 7 |
| Ireland (IRMA) | 2 |
| Italy (FIMI) | 4 |
| Latvia (Latvijas Top 30) | 2 |
| Netherlands (Dutch Top 40) | 17 |
| Netherlands (Single Top 100) | 11 |
| New Zealand (Recorded Music NZ) | 1 |
| Portugal (AFP) | 8 |
| Scotland Singles (OCC) | 2 |
| Sweden (Sverigetopplistan) | 34 |
| Switzerland (Schweizer Hitparade) | 10 |
| UK Singles (OCC) | 1 |
| UK Airplay (Music Week) | 43 |

=== Year-end charts ===
Year-end chart performance for "The Road to Mandalay"
| Chart (2001) | Position |
|---|---|
| Austria (Ö3 Austria Top 40) | 43 |
| Belgium (Ultratop 50 Flanders) | 53 |
| Belgium (Ultratop 50 Wallonia) | 70 |
| Europe (Eurochart Hot 100) | 46 |
| Germany (Media Control) | 33 |
| Ireland (IRMA) | 15 |
| Latvia (Latvijas Top 50) | 17 |
| Netherlands (Dutch Top 40) | 62 |
| Netherlands (Single Top 100) | 60 |
| New Zealand (RIANZ) | 16 |
| Switzerland (Schweizer Hitparade) | 51 |
| UK Singles (OCC) | 20 |

== Certifications ==
Certifications and sales for "The Road to Mandalay"
| Region | Certification | Certified units/sales |
|---|---|---|
| Belgium (BRMA) | Gold | 25,000^{*} |
| United Kingdom (BPI) | Gold | 418,000 |
^{*} Sales figures based on certification alone.
