= Guy Chambers =

English songwriter, musician and record producer (born 1963)

- Born: Guy Antony Chambers; 12 January 1963 (age 63); Hammersmith, London, England
- Occupations: Musician; record producer; songwriter
- Instruments: Piano, keyboards, guitar
- Website: guychambers.co.uk

Guy Antony Chambers (born 12 January 1963) is an English songwriter, musician and record producer. He has collaborated with Robbie Williams, Tina Turner, Kylie Minogue, Will Young, Scissor Sisters, Busted, Melanie C, Diana Ross, Tom Jones, James Blunt, Marlon Roudette, Rufus Wainwright, and Mark Ronson.

== Early life ==
Guy Chambers was born in 1963 in Hammersmith, London, England. He attended Quarry Bank Comprehensive School sixth form in Liverpool. From the age of 18, he studied composition and piano at the Guildhall School of Music, London, where he won the 1985 composition prize.

== Career ==
In December 1985, Chambers joined the Waterboys rock band as a keyboardist, touring with them supporting Simple Minds until the end of the year. He joined the group World Party in 1986, co-writing "Love Street" with Karl Wallinger, whom he had replaced in the Waterboys, on the band's album Goodbye Jumbo (1990). In the same year, Chambers appeared on the Mission's album Carved in Sand, providing the orchestral arrangement and piano for the song "Grapes of Wrath", and was producer for the short-lived group Stress with their debut album.

In 1992, Chambers formed his own band the Lemon Trees and wrote, produced and performed with them until they disbanded in 1995. The band only released one album – Open Book. Following the end of the Lemon Trees, Chambers wrote with Cathy Dennis on Am I the Kinda Girl? and other albums before meeting Robbie Williams in January 1997.

He released his debut solo piano album Go Gentle Into the Light on 3 May 2019. It reached number 49 on the UK Albums Chart.

=== Robbie Williams ===
Chambers collaborated, both as a songwriter and producer, on Robbie Williams' first five albums, all of which reached number one in the UK and achieved global sales of more than 40 million copies. The songs they co-wrote include "Rock DJ", "Feel", "Millennium", "Let Me Entertain You", and "Angels".

Their first work together, Life thru a Lens, was released in September 1997, with singles "Angels" and "Let Me Entertain You". In the next five years, they produced four more number-one albums: I've Been Expecting You, Sing When You're Winning, Swing When You're Winning, and Escapology.

Chambers featured in the 2023 documentary about Williams on Netflix.

=== Other collaborations ===
In 2002, Chambers wrote "Staring Into Space" for BBMak's second album. In 2003, he co wrote "Melt" with Melanie C on the album Reason, which he co-produced with Richard Flack.

In 2004, Chambers worked with Beverley Knight, co-writing the title track of Affirmation, "No-One Ever Loves in Vain", "Under the Same Sun" and the top-ten single "Come As You Are". He reunited with Knight on the 2009 album 100% and co-wrote the track "Soul Survivor" that Knight duetted on with Chaka Khan. That same year he co-wrote "Shine" with Kara DioGuardi for Hilary Duff. Chambers also co-wrote and co-produced "Silent Movie" with Natasha Bedingfield for her album Unwritten. In the same year, he co-produced American singer-songwriter Aslyn's debut album Lemon Love, co-wrote the song "Here", and co-wrote seven songs on Brian McFadden's debut album Irish Son, including the single "Real to Me", and the follow-up singles "Irish Son" and "Demons".

In 2007, Chambers co-wrote four songs on Anastacia's fourth album Heavy Rotation. He contributed songwriting and production to Christophe Willem's second album Caféine in 2009, co-writing the single "Heartbox" with Matt Hales from Aqualung, and working with Cathy Dennis on "Sensitized", a duet between Willem and Kylie Minogue. Additional work that year involved new work with British artists Julian Perretta, Katie Melua, Random Impulse, Marlon Roudette, and Taio Cruz.

In 2010, Chambers began working on the single "World Behind My Wall" by pop rock band Tokio Hotel. He also co-wrote Tokio Hotel's track "Pain of Love", which featured on their album Humanoid. Katie Melua's album The House, released on 24 May 2010, included five co-written songs for her new album, produced by William Orbit, including "I'd Like to Kill You", "The Flood" (first single), "A Happy Place", "A Moment of Madness" and "Tiny Alien". Chambers also worked on the track "Virtual Friend", co-written with Armin van Buuren for his 2010 album Mirage.

In 2011, Chambers worked on new material with English singer-songwriters Katy B and Charlene Soraia. He also teamed up with Example, co-writing the song "Microphone" which featured on Example's album Playing in the Shadows. In the same year, Chambers worked with Marlon Roudette, producing and co-writing her single "New Age". A track Chambers had written with Julian Lennon titled "Never Let You Go" was released on Lennon's album Everything Changes. Chambers collaborated with BBC2 for two three-part programmes: Goldie's Band: By Royal Appointment, airing in April, and Secrets of a Pop Song, which aired throughout July. Through the series, Chambers worked alongside Mark Ronson to create a single, singer-songwriter Rufus Wainwright to create a ballad, and British band Noisettes to compose an anthem. Chambers and Wainwright's "World War III" features on the digital version of Wainwright's album Out of the Game.

Chambers has collaborated with Sophie Hunter on two studio albums: the French-language The Isis Project (2005) and the English-language Songs for a Boy (2011).

In 2013, Chambers collaborated with Maverick Sabre in his new West London studio on new material for the artist, as well as working on new material with Rufus Wainwright, and co-writing "Out of Control" with Miles Kane, a track from Kane's second studio album Don't Forget Who You Are. In 2014, Chambers wrote "Crying for No Reason" with Katy B. In 2016, Chambers collaborated again with Kylie Minogue, Marlon Roudette, and Rufus Wainwright, and wrote and recorded with John Newman.

In 2024 Chambers co-wrote and produced the single "Falling Back" for Matteo Bocelli and Polish sensation Sanah which received critical acclaim, being described as "a captivating pop anthem" (Total Entertainment).

Chambers was portrayed by Australian actor Tom Budge in the 2024 biographical film Better Man, based on Robbie Williams' life and career.

=== Film composing ===
In 2024, Chambers wrote the score and songs, including five in collaboration with Amy Wadge, for the animated film The Night Before Christmas In Wonderland, the debut feature film by Academy Award and BAFTA-winning animation director Peter Bayton. The soundtrack features the voices of Gerard Butler, Emilia Clarke, Mae Muller, and Mawaan Rizwan. This was the second time Chambers worked with Lupus Films, having previously written the score and original songs for Sky Cinema's original film A Christmas Number One.

== Charity work ==
On 25 October 2012, Chambers, Steve Rotheram MP and Kenny Dalglish called a press conference in the Houses of Parliament to announce the release of the charity single "He Ain't Heavy, He's My Brother" – a cover of the Hollies track that was aiming to raise funds and awareness for the campaign for justice for the Hillsborough families who lost 96 loved ones in the football disaster of 1989. The single was released on 17 December 2012 and went on to take the Christmas number-one position for 2012 on the UK singles chart.

In March 2026, Chambers was announced by Tomorrow's Warriors – a music education and artist development charity founded in 1991 – as one of the organisation's 12 inaugural patrons, the others being Baroness Amos, Margaret Busby, Robert Elms, Nick Hornby, Lizzie Ridding and John Ridding, Michael Watt, Richard Wyatt, Femi Koleoso, Eska and Moses Boyd.

== Discography ==
Solo albums

- Go Gentle Into the Light (2019) No. 49 UK

Production work
Chambers has contributed as a musician, producer and/or writer to the following:

Albums

- Fragile (1994) – Frances Ruffelle
- The Christmas Present (2019) – Robbie Williams
- Under the Radar Volume 3 – (2019) Robbie Williams
- Under the Radar Volume 2 (2017) – Robbie Williams
- The Heavy Entertainment Show (2016) – Robbie Williams
- Under the Radar Volume 1 (2014) – Robbie Williams
- Swings Both Ways (2013) – Robbie Williams
- Don't Forget Who You Are (2013) – Miles Kane
- The Shocking Miss Emerald (2013) – Caro Emerald
- Femme Schmidt (2012) – SCHMIDT
- Out of the Game (2012) – Rufus Wainwright
- A Holiday Carole (2011) – Carole King
- Battleground (2011) – The Wanted
- Playing in the Shadows (2011) – Example
- Matter Fixed (2011) – Marlon Roudette
- Songs for a Boy (2011) – Sophie Hunter
- 100% (2011) – Beverley Knight
- The Sea (2011) – Melanie C
- The Wanted (2010) – The Wanted
- In and Out of Consciousness: Greatest Hits 1990–2010 (2010) – Robbie Williams
- Mirage (2010) – Armin van Buuren
- The House (2010) – Katie Melua
- Caféine (2010) – Christophe Willem
- Reality Killed the Video Star (2009) – Robbie Williams
- Humanoid (2009) – Tokio Hotel
- Love Is Dead (2009) – Kerli
- Boombox (2009) – Kylie Minogue
- Tina!: Her Greatest Hits (2008) – Tina Turner
- Heavy Rotation (2008) – Anastacia
- I Am (2008) – Monrose
- e2 (2008) – Eros Ramazzotti
- MP3 (2008) – M. Pokora
- X (2007) – Kylie Minogue
- This Delicate Thing We've Made (2007) – Darren Hayes
- Music City Soul (2007) – Beverley Knight
- This Time (2007) – Melanie C
- Welcome to Reality (2007) – Ross Copperman
- The Orange Album (2007) – Stefy
- Forever Begins Tonight (2006) – Patrizio Buanne
- What Love Is (2006) – Erin Boheme
- Voice (2006) – Beverley Knight
- Switch (2005) – INXS
- The Isis Project (2005) – Sophie Hunter
- Beautiful Intentions (re-release) (2005) – Melanie C
- Tissues and Issues (2005) – Charlotte Church
- Catching Tales (2005) – Jamie Cullum
- Lemon Love (2005) – Aslyn
- Nolita (2004) – Keren Ann
- Back To Bedlam (2004) – James Blunt
- Affirmation (2004) – Beverley Knight
- Irish Son (2004) – Brian McFadden
- Unwritten (2004) – Natasha Bedingfield
- Mistaken Identity (2004) – Delta Goodrem
- Hilary Duff (2004) – Hilary Duff
- Andrea (2004) – Andrea Bocelli
- Ultimate Kylie (2004) – Kylie Minogue
- Greatest Hits (2004) – Robbie Williams
- Save Yourself (2004) – Speedway
- A Present For Everyone (2003) – Busted
- Careful What You Wish For (2003) – Texas
- Reason (2003) – Melanie C
- Fleshwounds (2003) – Skin
- Funky Dory (2003) – Rachel Stevens
- SoulO (2003) – Nick Lachey
- Live at Knebworth (2003) – Robbie Williams
- From Now On (2002) – Will Young
- Into Your Head (2002) – BBMak
- Escapology (2002) – Robbie Williams
- Love & Life (2001) – Diana Ross
- Swing When You're Winning (2001) – Robbie Williams
- Jardin Secret (2001) – Axelle Red
- Light Years (2000) – Kylie Minogue
- Sing When You're Winning (2000) – Robbie Williams
- Reload (1999) – Tom Jones
- The Live Adventures of the Waterboys (1999) – The Waterboys
- I've Been Expecting You (1998) – Robbie Williams
- Life Thru a Lens (1997) – Robbie Williams
- Egyptology (1997) – World Party
- Am I the Kinda Girl? (1996) – Cathy Dennis
- Bang! (1993) – World Party
- Stress (1991) – Stress
- Goodbye Jumbo (1990) – World Party

Singles

- "Only When We're Naked" (2017) – Zak Abel
- "Dream A Little Dream" (2013) – Robbie Williams
- "Go Gentle" (2013) – Robbie Williams
- "Tangled Up" (2013) – Caro Emerald
- "He Aint Heavy ... He's My Brother" (2012) – The Justice Collective
- "Single Tear" (2012) – Tyler James
- "New Age" (2011) – Marlon Roudette
- "Soul Survivor" (2010) – Beverley Knight
- "A Happy Place" (2010) – Katie Melua
- "The Flood" (2010) – Katie Melua
- "World Behind My Wall" (2010) – Tokio Hotel
- "Why Not Us" (2008) – Monrose
- "Naïve" (2007) – Axelle Red
- "Together We Are One" (2006) – Delta Goodrem
- "Afterglow" (2006) – INXS
- "Pretty Vegas" (2005) – INXS
- "First Day of My Life" (2005) – Melanie C
- "Come As You Are" (2004) – Beverley Knight
- "Real To Me" (2004) – Brian McFadden
- "Irish Son" (2004) – Brian McFadden
- "Out of the Blue" (2004) – Delta Goodrem
- Let's Take Our Time (2004) – Ryan Cabrera
- "I'll See It Through" (2003) – Texas
- "Sexed Up" (2003) – Robbie Williams
- "Something Beautiful" (2003) – Robbie Williams
- "Feel" (2002) – Robbie Williams
- "Somethin' Stupid" (2001) – Robbie Williams & Nicole Kidman
- "Better Man" (2001) – Robbie Williams
- "Eternity/The Road to Mandalay" (2001) – Robbie Williams
- "Let Love Be Your Energy" (2001) – Robbie Williams
- "Your Disco Needs You" (2001) – Kylie Minogue
- "Supreme" (2000) – Robbie Williams
- "Kids" (2000) – Robbie Williams & Kylie Minogue
- "Rock DJ" (2000) – Robbie Williams
- "Win Some Lose Some" (1999) – Robbie Williams
- "She's the One/It's Only Us" (1999) – Written by Karl Wallinger
- "Strong" (1999) – Robbie Williams
- "No Regrets" (1998) – Robbie Williams
- "Millennium" (1998) – Robbie Williams
- "Angels" (1997) – Robbie Williams
- "South of the Border" (1997) – Robbie Williams
- "Lazy Days" (1997) – Robbie Williams
- "Old Before I Die" (1997) – Robbie Williams

Films

- Walk Like a Panther (2017)
- What a Man (2012) – "New Age" – Marlon Roudette
- Arthur (2011) – "Can't Buy You" – Mark Ronson & Daniel Merriweather
- Kinky Boots (2005)
- Fantastic Four (2005) – "Always Come Back To You" – Ryan Cabrera
- Raise Your Voice (2004) – "Shine" – Hilary Duff
- Love Actually (2003) – "I'll See It Through" – Texas
- Finding Nemo (2003) – "Beyond The Sea" – Robbie Williams
- Bridget Jones's Diary (2001) – "Have You Met Miss Jones?", "Not of This Earth" – Robbie Williams
- A Knight's Tale (2001) – "We Are the Champions" – Robbie Williams
- Bend It Like Beckham (2002) – "Dream The Dream" – Shaznay Lewis
- Lock, Stock & Two Smoking Barrels (1998) – "Man Machine" – Robbie Williams
- Nobody Someday (2002) – "Nobody Someday" – Robbie Williams
- Mean Machine (2001) – "Let Me Entertain You" – Robbie Williams

Orchestral arrangements

- Julian Cope – "Sunspots" (Fried 1984)
- Julian Cope – "Sunshine Playroom" (World Shut Your Mouth 1984)
