= No Regrets (Robbie Williams song) =

1998 single by Robbie Williams

Single by Robbie Williams

from the album I've Been Expecting You
- A-side: "Antmusic"
- B-side: "Deceiving Is Believing"; "There She Goes" (live); "Sexed Up" (demo)
- Released: 30 November 1998
- Length: 5:10 (album version); 4:00 (radio edit)
- Label: Chrysalis
- Songwriters: Robbie Williams; Guy Chambers
- Producers: Guy Chambers; Steve Power

Robbie Williams singles chronology
"Millennium" (1998)	"No Regrets" / "Antmusic" (1998)	"Strong" (1999)

Music video
- "No Regrets" on YouTube

"No Regrets" is a song by English singer Robbie Williams. It was released on 30 November 1998 as the second single from his second studio album, I've Been Expecting You (1998). The track was written by Williams and Guy Chambers and features backing vocals from Neil Tennant of Pet Shop Boys and Neil Hannon of the Divine Comedy. In the United Kingdom, the song was released as a double A-side with a cover of Adam and the Ants' "Antmusic".

"No Regrets" / "Antmusic" became another top-five hit for Williams in the United Kingdom. "Antmusic" was also featured on the UK trailer to the Pixar animated film A Bug's Life (1998). One of the B-sides, "Sexed Up", was later re-recorded for the Escapology album and released as a single in 2003.

== Background ==
Before performing the song on BBC Electric Proms 2009, Williams stated that it was about the group he used to be in, Take That. He also announced they had made up in 2008 and changed the last word in the lyrics to 'alive'. Part of the song featured on Take That's Progress Live Tour in 2011.

== Release and reception ==
Chrysalis Records released two CD singles and a cassette single of "No Regrets" on 30 November 1998, followed by a 7-inch single on 7 December. The song reached number four on the UK Singles Chart and went on to sell over 200,000 copies, being certified silver by the British Phonographic Industry (BPI).

== Music video ==
The video has Robbie Williams at first performing in a Vegas-like show. He then realises he cannot fake being happy and leaves the stage. He walks to a petrol station (which is in Hurley opposite the former East Arms Pub), gets some petrol in a jerry can, and begins walking through crowds and over roads, dribbling petrol in a line the whole way. Finally, a spark is dropped at the petrol station and lights up the whole trail as Williams narrates the last lines.

== Track listings ==
UK CD1 and cassette single

1. "No Regrets" – 5:10
2. "Antmusic" – 3:31
3. "Deceiving Is Believing" – 4:30

UK CD2

1. "No Regrets" – 5:10
2. "There She Goes" (live at the Forum) – 2:51
3. "Sexed Up" (demo version) – 3:54
4. "There She Goes" (live at the Forum – enhanced video) – 2:51

UK 7-inch single and European CD single

1. "No Regrets" – 5:10
2. "Antmusic" – 3:31

European maxi-CD single

1. "No Regrets" – 5:10
2. "Antmusic" – 3:31
3. "Sexed Up" (demo version) – 3:54
4. "There She Goes" (live at the Forum) – 2:51
5. "There She Goes" (live at the Forum – enhanced video) – 2:58

French CD single

1. "No Regrets" (radio edit) – 4:00
2. "No Regrets" (album version) – 5:10
3. "Antmusic" – 3:31

== Credits and personnel ==
Credits are lifted from the I've Been Expecting You album booklet.

Studio

- Mastered at Metropolis Mastering (London, England)

Personnel

- Robbie Williams – writing, vocals
- Guy Chambers – writing, keyboards, piano, orchestral samples, bass synth, production, arrangement
- "Planet" Claire Worrall – backing vocals
- Neil Tennant – backing vocals
- Neil Hannon – backing vocals
- David Catlin-Birch – acoustic guitar
- Gary Nuttall – electric guitar
- Fil Eisler – bass guitar
- Chris Sharrock – drums
- Andy Duncan – percussion
- Steve Power – production, recording, mixing, programming
- Steve McNichol – programming
- Tony Cousins – mastering

== Charts ==
=== Weekly charts ===
Chart (1998–1999)	Peak position
Austria (Ö3 Austria Top 40)	34
Belgium (Ultratip Bubbling Under Flanders)	5
Europe (Eurochart Hot 100)	35
Europe (European Hit Radio)	3
Finland (Suomen virallinen lista)	16
Finland Airplay (Radiosoittolista)	6
France (SNEP)	67
Germany (GfK)	60
Greece (IFPI)	7
Hungary (Mahasz)	6
Iceland (Íslenski Listinn Topp 40)	4
Ireland (IRMA)	15
Italy (FIMI)	9
Italy (Musica e dischi)	21
Italy Airplay (Music & Media)	5
Latvia (Latvijas Top 40)	4
Netherlands (Single Top 100)	71
New Zealand (Recorded Music NZ)	29
Scottish Singles Sales (Official Charts) with "Antmusic"	3
Spain Airplay (Top 40 Radio)	18
Sweden (Sverigetopplistan)	43
UK Singles (Official Charts) with "Antmusic"	4
UK Airplay (Music Week)	4

=== Year-end charts ===
Chart (1998)	Position
Latvia (Latvijas Top 50)	62
UK Singles (OCC)	104

Chart (1999)	Position
Europe (European Hit Radio)	58
Latvia (Latvijas Top 50)	45

== Certifications ==
Region	Certification	Certified units/sales
United Kingdom (BPI)	Silver	200,000^{^}
^{^} Shipments figures based on certification alone.
