= Eternity (Robbie Williams song) =

2001 single by Robbie Williams

Single by Robbie Williams
- A-side: "The Road to Mandalay"
- B-side: "Toxic"
- Released: 9 July 2001
- Length: 5:02
- Label: Chrysalis
- Songwriters: Robbie Williams; Guy Chambers
- Producers: Guy Chambers; Steve Power

Robbie Williams singles chronology
"Let Love Be Your Energy" (2001)	"Eternity" / "The Road to Mandalay" (2001)	"Better Man" (2001)

Music video
- "Eternity" on YouTube

"Eternity" is a song by English singer-songwriter Robbie Williams. It was written by Williams along with Guy Chambers, while production was overseen by Chambers and Steve Power. "Eternity" does not appear on his third studio album, Sing When You're Winning (2000) but was later included on Williams' Greatest Hits album in 2004. The lyrics of "Eternity" were written as a tribute to Williams' close friendship with Geri Halliwell. Brian May of Queen plays electric guitar on the track.

Released on 9 July 2001 as a double A-side with "The Road to Mandalay", the single became the 20th-most-successful hit of 2001 in the United Kingdom, topping the country's singles chart, and also peaked at number two in Ireland. "Eternity" as a solo single reached number one in New Zealand and became a top-10 hit in eight other countries. Though "Eternity" never appeared on a Robbie Williams studio album, a comedic snippet of the song can be heard in "Outtakes", a hidden track on Swing When You're Winning.

== Music videos ==
The video for "Eternity" is a sequel to "The Road to Mandalay". It was directed by Vaughan Arnell. It is mixed with scenes from the first video, which are scenes of Williams and his girlfriend lounging around their house in Spain, playing pool and walking along the beach and jumping on the trampoline. These scenes are also intercut with scenes of Williams and his girlfriend standing opposite each other, looking wistfully at each other. The end of the video shows Williams giving his girlfriend a long parting kiss, then being handcuffed and led away to several waiting Guardia Civil police cars, having been tracked down from clues left at the scene of the robbery.

== Track listings ==
UK CD and cassette single

1. "Eternity" – 5:02
2. "The Road to Mandalay" – 3:57
3. "Toxic" – 3:48

European CD single

1. "Eternity" – 5:02
2. "The Road to Mandalay" – 3:57

French CD single

1. "The Road to Mandalay" – 3:57
2. "Eternity" – 5:02

== Credits and personnel ==
Credits are taken from the Greatest Hits album booklet.

Studio

- Mastered at Metropolis Mastering (London, England)

Personnel

- Robbie Williams – writing, lead vocals
- Guy Chambers – writing, piano, production, arrangement
- Gary Nuttall – backing vocals, acoustic guitar
- Claire Worrall – backing vocals
- Phil Palmer – acoustic guitar
- Brian May – electric guitar
- Melvin Duffy – pedal steel guitar
- B. J. Cole – pedal steel guitar
- Dave Clayton – keyboards
- Andy Duncan – percussion
- Steve Power – production, mixing
- Richard Flack – Pro Tools
- Tony Cousins – mastering

== Charts ==
=== Weekly charts ===
Weekly chart performance for "Eternity"
Chart (2001)	Peak position
Austria (Ö3 Austria Top 40)	9
Belgium (Ultratop 50 Flanders)	6
Belgium (Ultratop 50 Wallonia)	9
Denmark (Tracklisten)	3
Europe (Eurochart Hot 100)	5
Europe (European Hit Radio)	5
France (SNEP)	45
Germany (GfK)	7
Ireland (IRMA)	2
Italy (FIMI)	4
Italy (Musica e dischi)	3
Latvia (Latvijas Top 30)	12
Netherlands (Dutch Top 40)	17
Netherlands (Single Top 100)	11
New Zealand (Recorded Music NZ)	1
Portugal (AFP)	8
Scottish Singles Sales (Official Charts)	2
Sweden (Sverigetopplistan)	34
Switzerland (Schweizer Hitparade)	10
UK Singles (Official Charts)	1
UK Airplay (Music Week)	9

=== Year-end charts ===
Year-end chart performance for "Eternity"
Chart (2001)	Position
Austria (Ö3 Austria Top 40)	43
Belgium (Ultratop 50 Flanders)	53
Belgium (Ultratop 50 Wallonia)	70
Europe (Eurochart Hot 100)	46
Europe (European Hit Radio)	39
Germany (Media Control)	33
Ireland (IRMA)	15
Latvia (Latvijas Top 50)	99
Netherlands (Dutch Top 40)	62
Netherlands (Single Top 100)	60
New Zealand (RIANZ)	16
Switzerland (Schweizer Hitparade)	51
UK Singles (OCC)	20

== Certifications ==
Certifications and sales for "Eternity"
Region	Certification	Certified units/sales
Belgium (BRMA)	Gold	25,000^{*}
United Kingdom (BPI)	Gold	418,000
^{*} Sales figures based on certification alone.
