= Nick Ingman =

English arranger, composer and conductor

Nicholas Ingman (born 29 April 1948) is an English arranger, composer and conductor in the commercial music field.

Born and educated in London, Ingman moved to the US at the age of seventeen to study at the Berklee College of Music and the New England Conservatory, both in Boston. After returning to London, he took a postgraduate course at the Guildhall School of Music and Drama. His first job was as assistant arranger with record producer Norrie Paramor. While there, here worked with Cliff Richard, the Shadows, Sacha Distel, and many more. During this time, he composed many library music tracks and the theme tune to BBC TV series Keeping Up Appearances.

After going freelance in the mid-1970s, Ingman worked with such major acts such as Pet Shop Boys, Radiohead, Oasis, Annie Lennox, Björk, David Bowie, Elton John, Eric Clapton, Lionel Richie, Madonna, Seal and Bono

Ingman worked regularly with the London Symphony Orchestra and the Royal Philharmonic Orchestra. In 1987, Ingman was invited by the Royal Academy of Music to create the Commercial Music Course, the first one in the country, which he ran for over ten years. Ingman was awarded Hon RAM in 2001 and Hon LCM from the London College of Music where he was a visiting professor. His film work as an orchestrator and conductor includes the films as Shakespeare in Love, Billy Elliot, Nowhere Boy, and The Passion of the Christ. He conducted the original recording of Jan A.P. Kaczmarek's Oscar-Winning score for Finding Neverland. Ingman's work as an arranger has accounted for 14 No. 1 singles and five double platinum albums in the UK. He has been nominated for a Grammy three times for his work with Eric Clapton, Sade Adu, and a recording of West Side Story with the Royal Liverpool Philharmonic.
