= Hook End Recording Studios =

Manor in Oxfordshire, England

Coordinates: 51.5279°N 1.0370°W

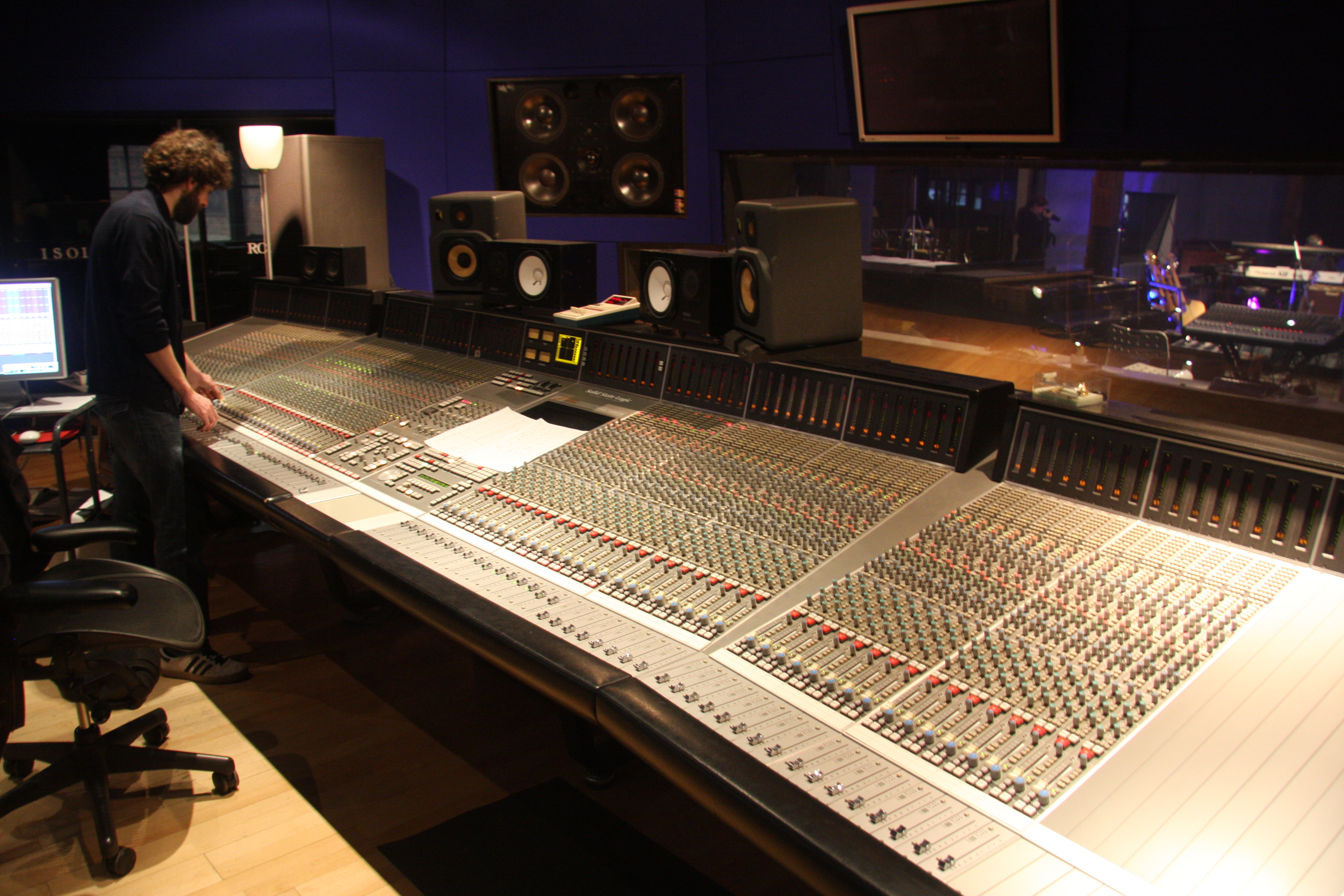
- The control room at Hookend
- Company type: Recording studio
- Industry: Audio recording
- Predecessor: Space Studios; Sarm Hook End
- Headquarters: Checkendon, Oxfordshire, England

Hook End Recording Studios was a recording studio located in Hook End Manor, a 16th-century Elizabethan house near Checkendon, Oxfordshire, England. Its previous owners include the musicians Trevor Horn and David Gilmour.

== History ==
Hook End Manor

The original studio, Space Studios, was built by Alvin Lee of the band Ten Years After when he first bought the house. Many recordings were made during Lee's tenure, including On the Road to Freedom (1973), before he sold the house and studio to David Gilmour of the band Pink Floyd, who used the studio to record parts of the band's album The Final Cut (1983). Gilmour sold the house and studio to Clive Langer and Alan Winstanley. They sold it to Trevor Horn, who turned it into Hookend Productions Ltd. It became part of Sarm Studios and was known as Sarm Hook End.

Several major rock bands have recorded albums at the studios. These include Manic Street Preachers' Gold Against the Soul (1993), The Cure's Disintegration (1989) and Mixed Up (1990), and Marillion's Seasons End (1989) and Holidays in Eden (1991).

In or around 2009, Hook End Manor was purchased by Mark White, who reportedly still owned it as of 2016. In October 2017, the house was reported to be abandoned and in a state of disrepair.
