= Steve Power =

- Born: Stephen Power; Liverpool, England
- Genre: Pop rock
- Occupations: Record producer; mixer
- Years active: 1981–present

Steve Power (born in Liverpool) is an English record producer best known for his work with Robbie Williams. He has produced and mixed for a wide variety of artists over the years, including Blur, Busted, Andrea Bocelli, Feeder, Joe Cocker, Diana Ross, Babybird, Babylon Zoo, Stephen Duffy, Black, the Bangles, Billy Ocean, Samantha Fox, James, Julian Cope, McFly, Ray LaMontagne and Kylie Minogue. Recently, he has worked with artists as diverse as Beth Rowley, Stephen Duffy, Julian Velard, David Ford, Laura Critchley, Nerina Pallot, and Wonderland.

== Biography ==
Power got his start in the music industry as a member of new wave band Hambi and the Dance, signed to Virgin Records in 1981. With the advance from the deal, Hambi built the Pink Recording Studios in Liverpool where they recorded their debut album. While the band were away touring, Power stayed behind to run the studio as a commercial venture, and he began recording bands from the Liverpool scene. Clients included Frankie Goes to Hollywood, Dead or Alive, Black, and A Flock of Seagulls.

Around 1983, Power was signed by producer manager Buzz Carter, subsequently moving to London and working with Julian Cope and Level 42 among others.

== The Battery years ==
In 1986, Power was hired as a house engineer at Battery Studios, where he worked on a variety of projects, including Billy Ocean's Love Zone, A Flock of Seagulls' The Story of a Young Heart, and the Icicle Works' If You Want to Defeat Your Enemy, Sing His Song. Productions and mixes from this period include James' Strip-mine.

== Work with Robbie Williams ==
In 1997, after a successful run in the charts including Babybird's "You're Gorgeous" and Babylon Zoo's "Spaceman", Power was approached by writer/producer Guy Chambers to co-produce a solo album for ex-Take That member Robbie Williams. The first album, Life thru a Lens, remained in the British top ten for 40 weeks and 218 weeks altogether in the charts, with sales of over 2.4 million. Chambers and Power were jointly awarded Producer of the Year by the International Managers' Forum for the album. Power went on to produce the four following Williams albums, I've Been Expecting You, Sing When You're Winning, Swing When You're Winning, and Escapology, all selling over 2 million in the UK alone, each one listed in the Top 100 Best Selling UK albums, making Williams the best-selling British solo artist ever.

== Later work ==
Power has continued producing and mixing records, including Beth Rowley's Little Dreamer, Stephen Duffy's Runout Groove, Julian Velard's The Planeteer, Nerina Pallot's The Graduate, Sandy Leah's Manuscrito, Hind Laroussi's Crosspop, and albums by Julian Velard, British Sea Power, Bauer and Wonderland. Power also has writing and production credits for songs in the Kevin Sampson film Powder.
