= List of reggae compilation albums =

This is a list of reggae music compilations. It includes LP and CD compilations featuring music from the various styles of reggae, including mento, ska, rocksteady, early/roots reggae, dub, and dancehall, etc.

== List of compilations ==
=== A ===
- Arkology

=== B ===
- Bellyas
- Black Lion Reggae Invasion Vol. 1
- Blunted in the Bomb Shelter

=== C ===
- Caribbean Connection

=== D ===
- Diwali Riddim

=== G ===
- Greensleeves Rhythm Album

=== H ===
- The Harder They Come

=== K ===
- Korak napred 2 koraka nazad

=== M ===
- The Mighty Two

=== N ===
- Now That's What I Call Reggae

=== O ===
- Open the Iron Gate: 1973–77

=== R ===
- Raggamuffin Vol 1
- Raggamuffin Vol 2
- Reggae Gold 1998
- Reggae Gold 2012
- Reggae Golden Jubilee
- Riddim Driven (series)
- Roots to the Bone

=== S ===
- Strictly The Best vol. 46
- Strictly The Best vol. 47

=== T ===
- The Time Has Come: The Best of Ziggy Marley & the Melody Makers
- This Is Reggae Music: The Golden Era 1960-1975
- Trojan Box Set series

=== V ===
- Voice of Jamaica, Vol.3

=== W ===
- Watch How the People Dancing: Unity Sounds from the London Dancehall 1986–1989

== See also ==
- Reggae
- Reggae festivals
- Reggae genres
