= Arkeology (World Party album) =

2012 box set by World Party

Box set by World Party
- Released: 10 April 2012
- Genre: Rock
- Label: Seaview
- Producer: Karl Wallinger

World Party chronology
Best in Show (2007)	Arkeology (2012)	Live! (2014)

Professional ratings
Review scores
Source	Rating
AllMusic	3.5/5 stars
Classic Rock	8/10 stars

Arkeology is a box set by World Party released on 10 April 2012 in the US and on 28 May 2012 in the UK.

== Overview ==
The box set is composed almost entirely of previously unreleased material: 70 tracks include an "unheard history of rare studio gems, live sessions, concert recordings, radio interviews, covers, demos and B-sides."

The newly recorded songs include "Words" (2011), "Everybody's Falling In Love" (2011), "Photograph" (1994-2011) and "Waiting Such a Long Time" (2008).

The previously released album tracks include "All The Love That's Wasted" from the original release of Dumbing Up and "Kuwait City", a hidden track from the early pressings of Bang!.

Despite the amount of tracks in the box, a number of b-sides was overlooked for the release like the covers of "No.9 Dream" and "Penny Lane" from "Beautiful Dream" single.

== Track listing ==
All songs written by Karl Wallinger, except where noted.

=== Disc 1 ===
1. "Waiting Such a Long Time" (2008) – 3:58
2. "Nothing Lasts Forever" (2000) – 4:04
3. "Everybody's Falling in Love" (2011) – 3:49
4. "Where Are You Going When You Go?" (1994) – 2:29
5. "Photograph" (1994-2011) – 4:52
6. "Everybody Dance Now" (2011) – 5:23
7. "Closer Still" (1993) – 1:07
8. "I Want to Be Free" (1994) – 2:51
9. "I'm Only Dozing" (1995) – 4:27
10. "No More Crying" (1993) – 4:20
11. "Interview/Sweet Soul Dream (Radio Appearance, Minneapolis, 2006)" – 8:45

=== Disc 2 ===
1. "Lucille" (Albert Collins, Richard Penniman) (1988) – 2:28
2. "The Good Old Human Race" (1989) – 3:25
3. "Put the Message in the Box (Live 1993)" – 4:34
4. "Trouble Down Here" (1986) – 4:59
5. "Basically" (1993) – 4:47
6. "Silly Song" (1995) – 0:37
7. "Man We Was Lonely" (Paul McCartney) (2001) – 2:57
8. "She's the One (Live on Later... with Jools Holland 1997)" – 4:33
9. "Ship of Fools (Live in Boulder, Colorado 1998)" – 5:53
10. "Mystery Girl (Live at Radio Station 2006)" – 3:07
11. "This Is Your World Speaking (Live) (UK 1987)" – 9:03
12. "All the Love That's Wasted" (2000) – 4:32
13. "Lost in Infinity" (1998) – 6:13
14. "New Light (Demo)" (1999) – 1:38

=== Disc 3 ===
1. "Words" (1991) – 5:28
2. "Dear Prudence" (John Lennon, McCartney) (1987) – 3:04
3. "Call Me Up Radio Session (Live on GLR Johnnie Walker Show 1997)" – 4:31
4. "Like a Rolling Stone (Live at the Wadsworth Theatre, Los Angeles 1993)" (Bob Dylan) – 8:02
5. "Sooner or Later (Live 1994)" – 5:47
6. "Love Street (Live at Bonnaroo Festival 2006)" – 5:04
7. "Time on My Hands" (Dave Catlin-Birch) (1993) – 4:37
8. "Who Are You (Live in Brisbane 2007)" – 4:35
9. "Sweetheart Like You" (Dylan) (1986) – 5:25
10. "Another World" (1986) – 3:27
11. "You're Beautiful, But Get Out of My Life" (1989) – 3:46
12. "Living Like the Animals" (1984) – 4:03
13. "Stand! (Live in USA 1991)" (Sylvester Stewart) – 4:09
14. "Thank You World (Pre-edit)" (1989) – 6:30

=== Disc 4 ===
1. "Break Me Again" (1989) – 9:26
2. "Baby" (1991) – 5:23
3. "Ship of Fools (Live Kilburn Empire 1990)" – 6:44
4. "Put the Message in the Box (Live USA 2006)" – 4:08
5. "When Did You Leave Heaven?" (Richard A. Whiting, Walter Bullock) (1991) – 3:11
6. "Nature Girl" (1990) – 4:21
7. "It's a Pity You Don't Let Go" (1995) – 3:32
8. "My Pretty One" (1993) – 2:23
9. "De Ho De Hay" (1992) – 0:52
10. "We Are the Ones" (1993) – 4:47
11. "World Groove / Mind Guerilla" (1987) – 2:47
12. "Happiness Is a Warm Gun" (Lennon, McCartney) (1990) – 2:30
13. "Kuwait City" (1993) – 3:11
14. "Do What I Want" (1994) – 3:58
15. "All We Need Is Everything (Demo)" (1994) – 3:36
16. "Outro" (2011) – 2:41

=== Disc 5 ===
1. "Mystery Girl" (1993) – 3:33
2. "What Is Love All About (Alternate Drums)" (1992) – 6:56
3. "I Hope It All Works Out for You (Demo)" (1995) – 3:39
4. "And God Said (Long Version)" (Guy Chambers, Wallinger) (1992) – 0:58
5. "It Ain't Gonna Work" (1992) – 4:56
6. "Another One" (1994) – 6:09
7. "I Am Me" (1996) – 6:00
8. "It's Gonna Be Alright" (1994) – 1:52
9. "In Another World" (1994) – 3:33
10. "Thank You World (Live in London 1991)" – 7:32
11. "Cry Baby Cry" (Lennon, McCartney) (1992) – 3:04
12. "Temple of Love" (Chambers) (1992) – 3:06
13. "Fixing a Hole" (Lennon, McCartney) (1994) – 2:43
14. "Way Down Now (Live in London 1991)" – 6:50
15. "Change the World (Demo)" (1996) – 1:46
