= Arkeology =

Arkeology is the study of the story of Noah's Ark and the searches for physical evidence which would corroborate it.
It may also refer to:

- Arkeology (The Ark album), 2011
- Arkeology (World Party album), 2012
- Arkology (album), 1997 album released by Lee "Scratch" Perry
- Arcology, a proposed type of massive habitation building
