= Arkology =

Arkology may refer to:

- Arkology (album), 1997 compilation album by Lee "Scratch" Perry
- Arcology, a proposed type of massive habitation building
- Arkeology (The Ark album), 2011
- Arkeology (World Party album), 2012
- Searches for Noah's Ark
