= Goodbye Jumbo =

1990 studio album by World Party

Studio album by World Party
- Released: 17 April 1990 (US); 7 May 1990 (UK)
- Recorded: 1987–1989
- Studios: Seaview Studios (London); The Old Rectory (Bedfordshire)
- Genres: Rock; alternative rock; neo-psychedelia; pop
- Length: 53:22
- Label: Ensign
- Producer: Karl Wallinger

World Party chronology
Private Revolution (1986)	Goodbye Jumbo (1990)	Bang! (1993)

Singles from Goodbye Jumbo
- 1. "Way Down Now" Released: 20 August 1990; 2. "Put the Message in the Box" Released: 1990; 3. "Thank You World" Released: 1991

Goodbye Jumbo is the second studio album by Welsh-British alternative rock band World Party, released in May 1990 on Ensign Records.

The album received generally positive reviews from critics and peaked at No. 73 on the US Billboard 200 and No. 36 on the UK Albums Chart. "Way Down Now", the album's lead single, spent five weeks at number one on the Billboard Alternative Songs chart, and follow-up single "Put the Message in the Box" reached No. 8.

== Background ==
Wallinger used the advance money from Chrysalis Records to install a 24-track machine in a rented space, paying a few hundred pounds a month for the location. He reckoned that over the course of three years that he had accumulated 62 reels of tape containing roughly 70 hours of music. Some of the material consisted of note-for-note recreations of songs from the Beatles and the Beach Boys. Wallinger failed to meet several deadlines imposed by the record company, prompting them to suggest pairing him with a recording engineer to push along the process. Eventually, Jon Blaney was brought in as an audio engineer, having previously worked on Lovesexy and one of Keith Richards's albums.

The album began to pick up momentum when Wallinger began collaborating with other musicians, including Jeff Trott, who had previously played with the Waterboys. Certain songs on the album took longer to finalise than others. "And I Fell Back Alone" was mixed once whereas "When the Rainbow Comes" received "something in the region of 200 mixes" according to Wallinger. Another song, "Thank You World" was roughly 7 minutes and 30 seconds at one point before going through several different iterations. As Wallinger explained:

There are songs that started off and changed, songs blown straight onto stereo without being on multi¬track, stuff with a whole band. Theres loads of copies of things—mainly Beatles, for some unknown reason.

== Critical reception ==
Professional ratings
Review scores
Source	Rating
AllMusic	4.5/5 stars
Chicago Tribune	3.5/4 stars
Classic Pop	4/5 stars
Entertainment Weekly	B+
Los Angeles Times	3.5/5 stars
NME	8/10
Q	4/5 stars
Record Mirror	4/5
Rolling Stone	4/5 stars
Sounds	5/5 stars

Writing for Spin, Jon Young deemed Goodbye Jumbo a "winning opus" and said that frontman Karl Wallinger's "unabashed enthusiasm" and "ability to craft killer pop tunes" prevent the album's liberal referencing of earlier musical styles from becoming "sterile". Chicago Tribune critic Greg Kot considered the album to be heavily influenced by the Beatles' "sense of pop and studio craft", further commenting that the "biting" humour and irony in its lyrics are effectively balanced by upbeat "melodies and moments". Chris Willman of the Los Angeles Times stated that Wallinger's "Lennonisms sound somehow endemic, not affected", and that the album never lapses into "petty theft" despite its numerous influences. In Rolling Stone, Don McLeese wrote that "Goodbye Jumbo displays an ambition as broad as the emotional range of its music", and that while "Wallinger's missionary zeal occasionally belabors his messages", the music "is sufficiently vital to overpower resistance". The Village Voice's Robert Christgau, however, dismissed the album as a "dud".

At the end of 1990, Goodbye Jumbo was named the year's best album by Q. It was also voted the fifteenth best album of 1990 in The Village Voice's year-end Pazz & Jop critics' poll. At the Grammy Awards' 1991 ceremony, Goodbye Jumbo was nominated for Best Alternative Music Performance. In 2000, it was ranked 94th on Q's list of the "100 Greatest British Albums Ever".

In 2000 it was voted number 474 in Colin Larkin's All Time Top 1000 Albums.

== Track listing ==
All tracks are written by Karl Wallinger.

No.	Title	Length
1.	"Is It Too Late?"	4:24
2.	"Way Down Now"	3:49
3.	"When the Rainbow Comes"	4:58
4.	"Put the Message in the Box"	4:16
5.	"Ain't Gonna Come Till I'm Ready"	5:05
6.	"And I Fell Back Alone"	3:57
7.	"Take It Up"	4:37
8.	"God on My Side"	4:14
9.	"Show Me to the Top" (contains untitled hidden track beginning at 4:42)	5:15
10.	"Love Street"	4:21
11.	"Sweet Soul Dream"	4:39
12.	"Thank You World"	3:47
Total length:		53:22

== Personnel ==
Credits for Goodbye Jumbo adapted from album liner notes.

=== Musicians ===
- Karl Wallinger – vocals, all instruments (except as indicated), composition, design, engineering, production
- Guy Chambers – drum samples (1), synthesizer (3, 4, 9, 10), sampler (4), backwards piano (5), acoustic piano (10), harmonium (11),
- Chris Sharrock – drum kit (2, 3, 4)
- Jeff Trott – slide guitar (1, 3), electric guitar (2), 12-string acoustic guitar (3)
- Jerod Minnies – acoustic guitar (1)
- Martyn Swain – bass guitar (10)
- Chris Whitten – drum kit (1, 5)
- Steve Wickham – violin (7)
- Roy Morgan – tambourine (2)
- Dave Catlin-Birch – guitar (6, 7)
- Sophia Ramos – backing vocals (3)
- Sinéad O'Connor – backing vocals (11)

=== Additional personnel ===
- Joe Blaney – engineering
- Karl Wallinger and Stephanie Nash – artwork
- Steven Fargnoli – management
- Karl Wallinger and Michael Nash – design
- Steve Wallace – photography
- Tim Young – digital editing, mastering

== Charts ==
Chart performance for Goodbye Jumbo
Chart (1990)	Peak position
Australian Albums (ARIA)	70
Canadian Albums (RPM)	26
Dutch Albums (Album Top 100)	38
Swedish Albums (Sverigetopplistan)	20
UK Albums (Official Charts)	36
US Billboard 200	73

== Certifications ==
Region	Certification	Certified units/sales
United Kingdom (BPI)	Silver	60,000^{^}
^{^} Shipments figures based on certification alone.
