= Happiness Is a Warm Gun =

1968 song by the Beatles

- Cover of the Northern Songs sheet music

Song by the Beatles

from the album The Beatles
- Released: 22 November 1968
- Recorded: 24–26 September 1968
- Studio: EMI, London
- Genre: Progressive rock; hard rock
- Length: 2:43
- Label: Apple
- Songwriter: Lennon–McCartney
- Producer: Chris Thomas (credited to George Martin)

"Happiness Is a Warm Gun" is a song by the English rock band the Beatles from their 1968 album The Beatles (also known as "the White Album"). It was written by John Lennon and credited to the Lennon–McCartney partnership. He derived the title from an article in American Rifleman magazine and explained that the lyrics were a double entendre for guns and his sexual desire for Yoko Ono.

Although tensions were high during the recording sessions for the White Album, the Beatles worked together as a unit to complete the song's challenging rhythmic structure and time signature changes. A demo of the song, recorded at George Harrison's Kinfauns home before the album's recording sessions, showed the song in its initial stage, with only a few portions present. Harrison helped with the time signature changes through his knowledge of Indian classical music. The final portion of the song features backing vocals by Harrison and Paul McCartney. An excerpt from the demo was released on Anthology 3 in 1996, with the full demo being released on the super deluxe edition of the White Album in 2018.

Despite mixed reviews for the White Album on release, "Happiness Is a Warm Gun" was positively received by music critics, who highlighted the song's complex structure and lyrics for praise. All four Beatles identified it as their favourite song on the album. It was banned by the BBC due to its sexually suggestive lyrics. The song has been covered by Tori Amos, U2, Phish and the Breeders.

== Background and inspiration ==
Lennon derived the title of "Happiness Is a Warm Gun" from an article in the May 1968 issue of American Rifleman. The magazine belonged to George Martin, the Beatles' producer, who had brought it with him to the recording studio. Lennon recalled his reaction to the phrase: "I just thought it was a fantastic, insane thing to say. A warm gun means you just shot something." Written by Warren W. Herlihy, the article told the story of how Herlihy had introduced his teenage son to shooting and how much the young man had come to enjoy the sport. The magazine had adapted the headline from the title of the bestselling book by Peanuts cartoonist Charles M. Schulz, Happiness is a Warm Puppy.

American journalist and songwriter Nicholas Schaffner suggested that the "warm gun" could refer to Lennon's sexual desire for Yoko Ono or, due to the drug connotations in the lyric "I need a fix", to a heroin syringe. In his 1980 Playboy interview, Lennon admitted to the double meaning of guns and sexuality but denied that the song had anything to do with drugs. He said: "that was the beginning of my relationship with Yoko and I was very sexually oriented then."

== Composition ==
Lennon said he "put together three sections of different songs [...] it seemed to run through all the different kinds of rock music", and described it as a miniature "history of rock and roll". This results in a three-part through-composed structure. The song begins with surreal imagery inspired by an acid trip that Lennon and Derek Taylor experienced, with Lennon and Taylor collaborating on the opening lines. The three sections were described by Lennon as "the Dirty Old Man", "the Junkie" and "the Gunman (Satire of '50s R&R)".

Author John Winn divides the completed composition into five sections: the fingerpicked guitar intro, with the line "She's not a girl who misses much"; the portion when the full band enters, containing more of the lyrical images supplied by Taylor; the blues-based "I need a fix" section; the "Mother Superior" refrain; and the doo wop-style section exploring the "warm gun" theme. The composite structure features several changes in time signature. According to Kenneth Womack, this consists of shifts from 4/4 to 6/4 time in the "Dirty Old Man" section; 9/8 and 12/8 in "the Junkie", although the drums play in 6/8 throughout; four-bar sequences of 6/8, 6/4, 6/8 and 7/4 over the "Mother Superior" portion; and 6/8 and 4/4 for "the Gunman" (even though the drums remain in 4/4). The musical keys used in the song are E minor, A major, A Lydian and C major.

The demo recorded by Lennon in May 1968 shows the song in its initial stage, with only the "I need a fix" and "Mother Superior jump the gun" portions present. Lennon extends the "Mother Superior" part, segueing into a portion addressing Ono by name, which does not appear in the Beatles' recording. The section that became the rock 'n' roll and doo-wop satire was partly previewed at the end of Lennon's performance of "I'm So Tired" from the same demo tape. This two-minute solo performance of "Happiness Is a Warm Gun" was edited for release on the Anthology 3 compilation album in 1996, with over 30 seconds being cut from the middle of the song.

== Recording ==
Recording for "Happiness Is a Warm Gun" began at 7 pm in Studio Two at EMI Studios in London on 23 September 1968. Although tensions were high among the Beatles during the album's recording sessions, the band collaborated as a close unit to work out the song's challenging rhythmic and metre issues. Having spent much of the first session discussing the individual sections, the group completed a satisfactory basic track on 24 September, albeit by editing together two separate performances: takes 53 and 65. Work on the song was completed at 5 am on 26 September. Piano, organ and tuba parts in this recording are unattributed; the tuba was all but removed through mixing. Martin was on holiday while this song was recorded, and had left a note asking Chris Thomas to take over as producer.

Having spent over two years studying the sitar, George Harrison had become familiar with the complex time signatures typically found in Indian classical music. Lennon benefited from Harrison's input in the arrangement for "Happiness Is a Warm Gun", further to the pair having joined different sections together for Lennon's 1966 song "She Said She Said". Author Simon Leng highlights Harrison's guitar playing on the completed track – ranging from stinging riffs beside Lennon's picked chords, to the heavily distorted solo that introduces the "I need a fix" bridge – as an example of Harrison's empathetic musicianship on Lennon's White Album songs. A tape containing just the 25 September instrumental overdubs reveals that the guitar solo was added to the previous day's backing track, along with organ (over the opening section of the song), tambourine and extra hi-hat, and piano (throughout the closing, "doo-wop" portion). In his description of this tape, music critic Richie Unterberger comments that the organ part, which appears low in the final mix, sounds "so churchly downcast it would do the Zombies proud". Over the "Gunman" section of the song, Paul McCartney and Harrison sang backing vocals in the doo-wop style, including the lines "Bang bang, shoot shoot" in response to Lennon singing the title phrase.

Musicologists Kenny Jenkins, of Leeds Beckett University and Richard Perks, University of Kent, have expressed the opinion that a Bartell fretless guitar belonging to Harrison was used on this track.

== Release and reception ==
Apple Records released The Beatles on 22 November 1968, with the double LP soon gaining the informal title "the White Album" due to its stark cover art. "Happiness Is a Warm Gun" was sequenced as the final track on side one, following "While My Guitar Gently Weeps". "Happiness Is a Warm Gun" was reportedly Harrison and McCartney's favourite track on the White Album. All four of the Beatles later identified it as their favourite song on the album. American and British censors were unhappy with the song, and it was banned by the BBC.

Nik Cohn gave the album an unfavourable review in The New York Times, but he wrote: "The only track that I've found myself actually playing for pleasure has been 'Happiness Is a Warm Gun', which is obviously mostly by John Lennon and which stands [in] roughly the same tradition as 'A Day in the Life' and 'I Am the Walrus'." Cohn added that although the song "includes more than its share of half-baked poeticisms", it develops into "a marvelous parody of high school rock in the mid-fifties of groups like the Diamonds and the Monotones", during which Lennon's bandmates support his repetition of the title phrase with interjections of 'Bang bang – shoot shoot'". Cohn concluded that "Just this once, the take-off has edge, it's not pure self-indulgence." Hubert Saal of Newsweek was also highly critical of the Beatles' propensity for pastiche, yet he included "Happiness Is a Warm Gun" among the few successes that result when they abandoned their attempts to be "Alexander Pope or Max Beerbohm". He said it featured "an orgasmic ending that Mick Jagger would admire".

Record Mirror commented that the song starts as "a serene ballad, but is soon taken over in the true vein of this foremost stylist", with the arrival of the "deep guitar" solo and lyrics referencing Mother Superior and the sensation of "my hands on your trigger". The reviewer said that "The firearm becomes feminine and the lyrics ambiguous in this strange subject matter for a song." Barry Miles wrote in International Times: "'Happiness is a Warm Gun' is one of the greatest numbers on the album. Again a very complex construction in which the music has three distinct phases ending with a touch of the '50s ... It has a fine developing deep bass line and uses a snatch from 'Angel Baby' by Rosie & The Originals at the end."

Coinciding with the 50th anniversary of its release, Jacob Stolworthy of The Independent listed the song at number 2 in his ranking of the White Album's 30 tracks, below Harrison's "While My Guitar Gently Weeps". Stolworthy described it as "A loaded weapon of a track" and "one of Lennon's best songs". In 2006, Mojo placed it at number 8 in the magazine's list of "The 101 Greatest Beatles Songs". In her commentary with the selection, American singer-songwriter Tori Amos highlighted "Happiness Is a Warm Gun" as a rare example of social commentary that successfully makes its statement "without preaching". Amos added: "The Beatles had the ability to make you think about the world, not just your own little world. They could put the microcosm and macrocosm in the same song. They sang of drugs and guns without telling me what to feel about it. That's genius." Beatles biographer Bill Harry commented on the irony of Lennon having written a song titled "Happiness Is a Warm Gun" and then, following his fatal shooting in New York City in December 1980, becoming the "most high profile" of the many musicians who have died as a result of the wide availability of guns in the United States.

== Personnel ==
According to Ian MacDonald, except where noted:

- John Lennon – double-tracked lead vocal, backing vocal, rhythm guitar, Hammond organ
- Paul McCartney – bass guitar, backing vocal, piano
- George Harrison – lead guitar, backing vocal
- Ringo Starr – drums, tambourine

== Cover versions ==
- Tori Amos, on her 2001 album Strange Little Girls. The recording includes an anti-gun message read out by her father. In 2006, Amos recalled that her decision to include the song was because of its relevance in the aftermath to the Columbine High School massacre and during an era of US gun control typified by the "father and son comedy team" of George H. W. Bush and George W. Bush, and the pair's "close connections" with the National Rifle Association. She added that in an accompanying picture of her included in the CD booklet, she was "playing the call girl character" that Mark Chapman had visited the night before he fatally shot Lennon on 8 December 1980.
- Phish, on the album Live Phish Volume 13.
- U2, as a B-side of the 1997 single Last Night on Earth.
- Joe Anderson with Salma Hayek, for the soundtrack of Across the Universe
- The Breeders, on the album Pod
- Marc Ribot, on the album Saints
- World Party, on the European maxi-single release of Way Down Now
- Annika Aakjær, on the collab album Come Together

== Works cited ==
- Dowlding, William J. (1989). Beatlesongs. Simon & Schuster Inc. ISBN 0-671-68229-6.
- Hertsgaard, Mark (1996). A Day in the Life: The Music and Artistry of the Beatles. London: Pan Books. ISBN 0-330-33891-9.
- Inglis, Ian (2000). The Beatles, Popular Music and Society: A Thousand Voices. Palgrave Macmillan Publishing.
- Leng, Simon (2006). While My Guitar Gently Weeps: The Music of George Harrison. Milwaukee, WI: Hal Leonard. ISBN 978-1-4234-0609-9.
- Lewis, Michael; Spignesi, Stephen J. (2004). 100 Best Beatles Songs: A Passionate Fan's Guide. Black Dog & Leventhal. ISBN 978-1-60376-265-6.
- Lewisohn, Mark (1995). The Complete Beatles Chronicle. Hamlyn. ISBN 0-600-58749-5.
- Lewisohn, Mark (2005) [1988]. The Complete Beatles Recording Sessions: The Official Story of the Abbey Road Years 1962–1970. London: Bounty Books. ISBN 978-0-7537-2545-0.
- MacDonald, Ian (1998). Revolution in the Head: The Beatles' Records and the Sixties. London: Pimlico. ISBN 978-0-7126-6697-8.
- Schaffner, Nicholas (1978). The Beatles Forever. New York, NY: McGraw-Hill. ISBN 0-07-055087-5.
- Sheff, David (2000) [1981]. All We Are Saying: The Last Major Interview with John Lennon and Yoko Ono. New York, NY: St. Martin's Press. ISBN 0-312-25464-4.
- Spitz, Bob (2005). The Beatles: The Biography. New York, NY: Little, Brown and Company. ISBN 1-84513-160-6.
- Spizer, Bruce (2003). The Beatles on Apple Records. 498 Productions. ISBN 0-9662649-4-0.
- Turner, Steve (2012) [1994]. A Hard Day's Write: The Stories Behind Every Beatles Song. London: Carlton. ISBN 978-1-78097-096-7.
- Unterberger, Richie (2006). The Unreleased Beatles: Music & Film. San Francisco, CA: Backbeat Books. ISBN 978-0-87930-892-6.
- Wenner, Jann S. (2000). Lennon Remembers (Full interview from Lennon's 1970 interview in Rolling Stone magazine). London: Verso. ISBN 1-85984-600-9.
- Winn, John C. (2009). That Magic Feeling: The Beatles' Recorded Legacy, Volume Two, 1966–1970. New York, NY: Three Rivers Press. ISBN 978-0-307-45239-9.
- Womack, Kenneth (2014). The Beatles Encyclopedia: Everything Fab Four. Santa Barbara, CA: ABC-CLIO. ISBN 978-0-313-39171-2.
