= Karl Wallinger =

Welsh born musician (1957–2024)

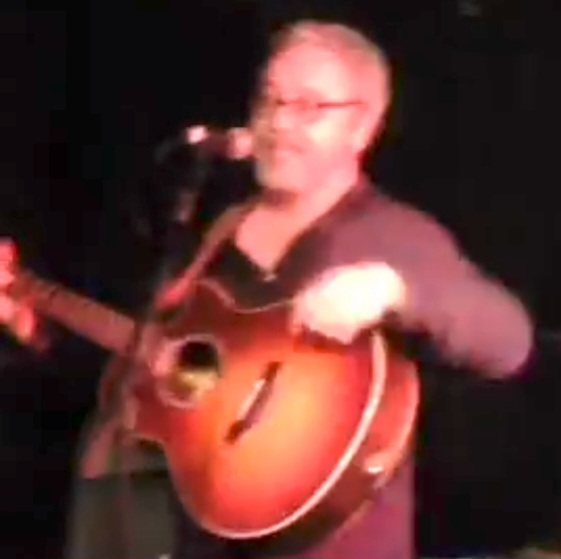
- Wallinger performing in 2015

Background information
- Born: Karl Edmond De Vere Wallinger; 19 October 1957; Prestatyn, Wales
- Died: 10 March 2024 (aged 66) Hastings, England
- Genres: Pop, alternative, folk rock, indie rock, psychedelic rock
- Occupations: Musician, songwriter, record producer
- Instruments: Vocals, keyboards, guitar, drums, bass, programming
- Years active: 1977–2024
- Formerly of: Pax; Quasimodo; The Waterboys; World Party

Karl Edmond De Vere Wallinger (19 October 1957 – 10 March 2024) was a Welsh musician, songwriter and record producer. He was best known for leading the band World Party and for his mid-1980s membership of the Waterboys (contributing in particular to the arrangement and recording of their hit single "The Whole of the Moon").

Wallinger's songwriting credits include the World Party songs "Ship of Fools", which was a Top 40 hit in the United States, "Way Down Now", which reached number one on the Billboard Modern Rock chart, and "She's the One", which was later covered by Robbie Williams and became a hit single.

Wallinger was a multi-instrumentalist, which enabled him to demo and record the bulk of World Party material as a one-man band. Although he was right-handed, he played a right-handed guitar upside-down and left-handed.

== Early life and early musical work ==
Wallinger was born on 19 October 1957, in Prestatyn, Wales, to Julian and Phyllis Wallinger, and was one of six children. His father was an architect. He showed musical promise from an early age, immersing himself in the music of the Beatles (notably studying Sgt. Peppers Lonely Hearts Club Band and attempting not only to sing the words but to vocally recreate all of the sounds on the record), the Beach Boys, Bob Dylan, the Kinks, Buddy Holly and the Motown label. This was followed by classical training in piano (from the age of nine) and oboe (from the age of ten). Having spent time at choir school at Eton College, his musical skills then won him a music scholarship to another public school, Charterhouse in Surrey.

Wallinger's musical career began in Prestatyn in 1977 as a keyboard player with Pax, before forming the short-lived band Quasimodo with Dave Sharp and Nigel Twist (who both went on to be in the Alarm). Having moved to London, he then had a job in music publishing working for Northern Songs. He played keyboards for Peter Straker and was featured on the album Changeling, on which he received a writing credit for the song "Believer". In the same period he became musical director of The Rocky Horror Show.

== The Waterboys ==
Answering a "guitarist wanted" advertisement for Mike Scott's band the Waterboys, Wallinger instead persuaded Scott that the band needed a keyboard player. Joining in 1983, Wallinger played in the live band touring the first Waterboys album and contributed to the second album, A Pagan Place.

Though Wallinger was initially hired to play piano and organ (and to sing occasional backing vocals), his multi-instrumental and production skills impressed Scott and ensured that he played a far greater role on the third Waterboys album, This Is the Sea, significantly contributing to the band's 'Big Music' sound. While Scott concentrated on Steve Reichian orchestrations of the songs using multitracked pianos and guitar, Wallinger fleshed out the material with a variety of synthesised orchestrations, synth bass and percussion instruments. Wallinger also wrote the original music for "Don't Bang the Drum" (the opening track for This Is the Sea). Wallinger was particularly key to the final form of the best-known Waterboys song, "The Whole of the Moon", having taken Scott's original voice/piano/guitar structure and introduced polyphonic synthesizer parts, synth bass, upbeat and off-beat cymbal accents (all of these influenced by Prince) and a final tumbling backing vocal (influenced by David Bowie), as well as bringing in drummer Chris Whitten.

Musical rivalry and desire for control over creative credit made the relationship between Scott and Wallinger increasingly difficult and fractious, and in subsequent years the two would occasionally bicker publicly about who was responsible for the success of the music they created together. However, in 2012, Scott would remember, more generously, that "Karl was always there for me. He was a great engineer, got great sounds, [and] was very patient while I would play nine different guitars. Reefers may have been involved, and some all-nights. We had a lot of laughs and philosophical discussions."This is The Sea producer Mick Glossop also spoke approvingly of Wallinger's contributions: "Karl's a very giving person. He gave a lot to the Waterboys, certainly."

Aware that his own musical ambitions were bringing him into conflict with Scott, Wallinger opted to leave the Waterboys in late 1985 towards the end of their 'This is the Sea' tour. He was replaced as Waterboys keyboard player by Guy Chambers. Many years later, Mike Scott commented that "from the day I met (Karl) he was always writing his own songs... The label I was with, Ensign, gave him a record deal and he deserved it, of course, but it wasn't the smartest move if they'd wanted to keep him in The Waterboys."

Leaving London, Wallinger relocated to Woburn and took up residence in a dilapidated former rectory in which to work on solo material (which would eventually emerge as World Party). During this time, Wallinger also worked on Sinéad O'Connor's 1987 debut album The Lion and the Cobra.

== World Party ==
World Party began as a solo studio project with Wallinger as a one-man-band (plus guests) exploring rock, pop, folk and funk ideas plus elements of other genres. In 2024, The Guardian's Graeme Thomson would summarise the band's best work as "sound(ing) like a man trying to cram all the love and joy of his own fandom into four minutes, to distil the essence of Bob Dylan, Prince, The Rolling Stones, Sly Stone, Van Morrison, The Beach Boys, perhaps above all The Beatles, into one bubbling, funky, heartfelt and slightly ramshackle homebrew." Thompson also noted that "the big hitters in the World Party canon... sound like the best kind of pop music: ageless, beyond genre. Turn to them at any time and they will brighten any room."

Despite its solo origins, World Party would later become a successful live band, albeit with Wallinger as the lone consistent member. Other significant World Party contributors over the years included Guy Chambers, Jeff Trott and Dave Catlin-Birch (with guest appearances including Waterboys saxophonist Anthony Thistlethwaite, violinist Steve Wickham, and vocalist Sinéad O'Connor returning favours owed for Wallinger's work on The Lion and the Cobra). In practise, however, Wallinger wrote nearly all of the songs alone as well as playing most of the instruments on the studio albums.

The first release under the World Party banner, 1986's Private Revolution, was strongly keyboard-based, diverse in stylistic focus and Prince-influenced (coinciding with Wallinger signing a deal with Prince manager Steve Fargnoli), and spawned a hit single, "Ship of Fools". The second album, 1990's Goodbye Jumbo, has been hailed as Wallinger's masterpiece and as "a restoration of ’60s pop values", consolidating Wallinger's pop interests into a more organic live-band sound while maintaining his diversity of approach. It was voted "album of the year" by Q magazine, was nominated for a Grammy Award for "best alternative music performance" in the US. and produced two hit singles, "Way Down Now" and "Put the Message in the Box".

Three further well-received World Party studio albums were released over the following decade - Bang! (1993), Egyptology (1997) and Dumbing Up (2000). The band also scored one more hit single - "Is It Like Today?" - and released two compilation albums (the greatest hits set Best in Show and the Arkeology box set), as well as premiering the original version of "She's the One" (a song written by Wallinger but later a Number One hit single for Robbie Williams). Shortly before his death, Wallinger had been working on a long-delayed sixth World Party album, although this has yet to be confirmed as being complete or ready for release.

World Party records were notable for their persistent commitment to green and environmentalist issues, initially at a time when this was unfashionable. This eventually extended to the no-frills, no-waste, communitarian-based packaging for Arkaeology, assembled by Wallinger and his own family and friends at home. Wallinger's perspective on these matters has been labelled "prescient and heartfelt, a fervent post-script to ’80s consumerism," and "well ahead of the times." Wallinger himself has commented "I wanted to personify the world and sing about her. I always thought it would have been great if Otis Redding's "Try a Little Tenderness" had been about the planet. Plus, if I stand on top of a mountain Julie Andrews-style, the hills do seem to be alive with the sound of music. You can say whatever you like about eco whatever, but if you fuck up the environment you're going to die."

== Soundtracking, other songwriting and collaborations ==
Throughout his career Wallinger continued to collaborate with others, including the aforementioned Sinead O'Connor while he also featured on the Bob Geldof album The Happy Club released in 1992.

He was musical director on the 1994 film Reality Bites, composing an instrumental score and contributing the end title song "When You Come Back to Me" to the hit soundtrack album. He also contributed a cover of David Bowie's "All the Young Dudes" to the Clueless soundtrack in 1995. His song "She's the One" (originally released by World Party) was a hit for Robbie Williams. "When the Rainbow Comes" was covered by Shawn Colvin on the soundtrack to Armageddon. Wallinger also acted as a member of Bob Geldof's backing band.

Two tracks by Wallinger are included on the 1997 compilation album Now and in Time to Be, a musical celebration of the works of Irish poet W. B. Yeats. The poem "Politics" was credited as having been interpreted by Wallinger, while World Party is acknowledged as a contributing artist on "The Four Ages of Man".

In 2008, Real World Records released the album Big Blue Ball – the culmination of work begun by Wallinger and Peter Gabriel during the summers of 1991, 1992, and 1995, in which they coordinated recordings by dozens of international artists at Real World Studios. When Gabriel learned of Wallinger's death in 2024, he referred to the 2008 project in a social media post: "I had admired his work from afar but it was when we did a Real World Recording Week together that I had the most creative and fun week I have ever had in the studio. Karl was overflowing with wonderful musical ideas that blew us all away, all delivered with terrible jokes that had us laughing uncontrollably all day and night. He was such a gifted, natural writer and player, it was a tap that he could turn on at will, effortlessly."

== Discography ==
=== With the Waterboys ===
- A Pagan Place (1984)
- This Is the Sea (1985)

=== With World Party ===
- Private Revolution (1986)
- Goodbye Jumbo (1990)
- Bang! (1993)
- Egyptology (1997)
- Dumbing Up (2000)

== Personal life ==
Wallinger was married to sculptor Suzie Zamit, who survived him. The two lived in Crouch End, north London, for many years before relocating to Hastings in 2017. Wallinger and Zamit had two children, Louis Wallinger and Nancy Zamit, and two grandchildren. Their daughter Nancy is a founding member of the comedy troupe Mischief Theatre.

In an interview with Chicago Tribune freelancer Jay Hedblade, Wallinger revealed that he was found to have had a brain aneurysm in February 2001. After several months of writing for the band, he felt unwell, and asked his friends to call an ambulance to take him to a hospital, where he was diagnosed with a brain aneurysm. He subsequently required surgery wherein the doctors had to clip the cerebral aneurysm near the optic nerve. Despite what would appear to be a full recovery, he lost his peripheral vision on the right side of both eyes. The aneurysm surgery caused him to suspend all work for nearly five years, eventually resuming touring in 2006.

Wallinger died from a stroke at his home in Hastings on 10 March 2024, at the age of 66.
