= C. B. Lister =

Charles Bayard Lister (July 4, 1898 – May 14, 1951) was an American firearms expert who was an officer of the National Rifle Association of America from 1926 to 1951.

== Early life ==
Lister was born on July 4, 1898, in Wilmington, Delaware to James W. and Florence (Carson) Lister. He became involved in sports shooting while a member of the Boy Scouts of America. After graduating from Wilmington High School, he worked under Kellogg Casey in the sales and promotions department of DuPont. In 1917, Lister joined the United States Army and remained there until the end of World War I. On October 22, 1919, he married Lynette Harper. They had one daughter.

== National Rifle Association ==
In 1921, Lister moved to Washington D.C. to become the advertising and promotion manager of the National Rifle Association. He recommended expanding NRA membership outside the United States Armed Forces and state militias and under his leadership, membership grew from 3,500 in 1921 to over 10,000 in 1925.

In 1926, he became the organization's secretary–treasurer and led a drive that increased membership to 350,000 by 1945. He also served as editor of the NRA's monthly magazine, the American Rifleman, was a contributor to the Encyclopædia Britannica, and edited the sections on rifles and marksmanship in Webster's International Dictionary. He was a leader in the fight against laws restricting firearm ownership, but did support some gun control measurers, including the National Firearms Act and the Federal Firearms Act of 1938.

Due to a prior bout of tuberculosis, Lister was rejected for active military service during World War II. He instead served as the national coordinator of rifle shooting in the Office of Civilian Defense. He also helped draft the first manual on home guard organization.

In 1949, Lister succeeded the retiring Milton Reckord as executive director of the NRA. He died of brain cancer on May 14, 1951, at the Washington Sanitarium. He was buried at Arlington National Cemetery.

Following his death, a memorial trophy was presented. Since 1952 it has been awarded for the National Indoor Sectional-National Smallbore Rifle Champion.
