= Egyptology (album) =

1997 studio album by World Party

Studio album by World Party
- Released: 16 June 1997
- Recorded: 1993–1997
- Studio: Seaview Studios (London)
- Genre: Rock
- Length: 60:36
- Label: Chrysalis (UK); The Enclave (US)
- Producer: Karl Wallinger

World Party chronology
Bang! (1993)	Egyptology (1997)	Dumbing Up (2000)

Singles from Egyptology
- 1. "Beautiful Dream" Released: 27 May 1997

Professional ratings
Review scores
Source	Rating
AllMusic	4/5 stars
Uncut	3/5 stars
New Musical Express	0/10 stars

Egyptology is the fourth studio album by World Party released in 1997.

== Overview ==
The album contains the Top 40 British single "Beautiful Dream" and the Ivor Novello Award-winning "She's the One", among other songs.

Despite that the album was not a commercial success in comparison to World Party's previous albums, and Karl Wallinger was upset when his label, Chrysalis, which led to release of the next World Party album on Wallinger's own label, Seaview.

"She's the One" was later recorded by pop artist Robbie Williams whose version hit #1 on the UK singles chart and won Williams several awards. Wallinger later wrote:

I was so lucky that Robbie recorded "She's the One" because it allowed me to keep going [after Wallinger's aneurysm in 2000]. He nicked my pig and killed it but gave me enough bacon to live on for four years. He kept my kids in school and me in Seaview [Wallinger's recording studio] and for that I thank him.

== Release ==
The album was re-released on CD in 2006 and on vinyl in 2022. The vinyl edition was a 2-LP set with fourth side consisting of previously unreleased live tracks recorded in NYC in 1997.

== Track listing ==
All songs written by Karl Wallinger

1. "It Is Time" – 3:20
2. "Beautiful Dream" – 4:45
3. "Call Me Up" – 2:57
4. "Vanity Fair" – 3:33
5. "She's the One" – 4:56
6. "Vocal Interlude" – 0:24
7. "Curse of the Mummy's Tomb" – 5:58
8. "Hercules" – 3:15
9. "Love Is Best" – 3:03
10. "Rolling Off a Log" – 5:54
11. "Strange Groove" – 4:10
12. "The Whole of the Night" – 3:15
13. "Piece of Mind" – 4:58
14. "This World" – 4:21
15. "Always" – 4:23

Additional tracks on the 2022 LP reissue
No.	Title	Length
16.	"It Is Time" (Live)	4:01
17.	"Beautiful Dream" (Live)	4:00
18.	"Rolling Off a Log" (Live)	6:01
19.	"Hercules" (Live)	4:58
20.	"Vanity Fair" (Live)	3:26

== Personnel ==
- Karl Wallinger – all instruments except where noted
- Chris Sharrock – drums (1, 2, 4, 7, 10–13), northern vibes

=== Guest musicians ===
- Johnson Somerset – loops (11, 15)
- Anthony Thistlethwaite – "additional massed saxes" (3)
- John Turnbull – guitar (12)

== Charts ==
Chart (1997)	Peak position
Swedish Albums (Sverigetopplistan)	22
UK Albums Chart	34
US Billboard 200	167
