= Arthur Corbin Gould =

American magazine publisher

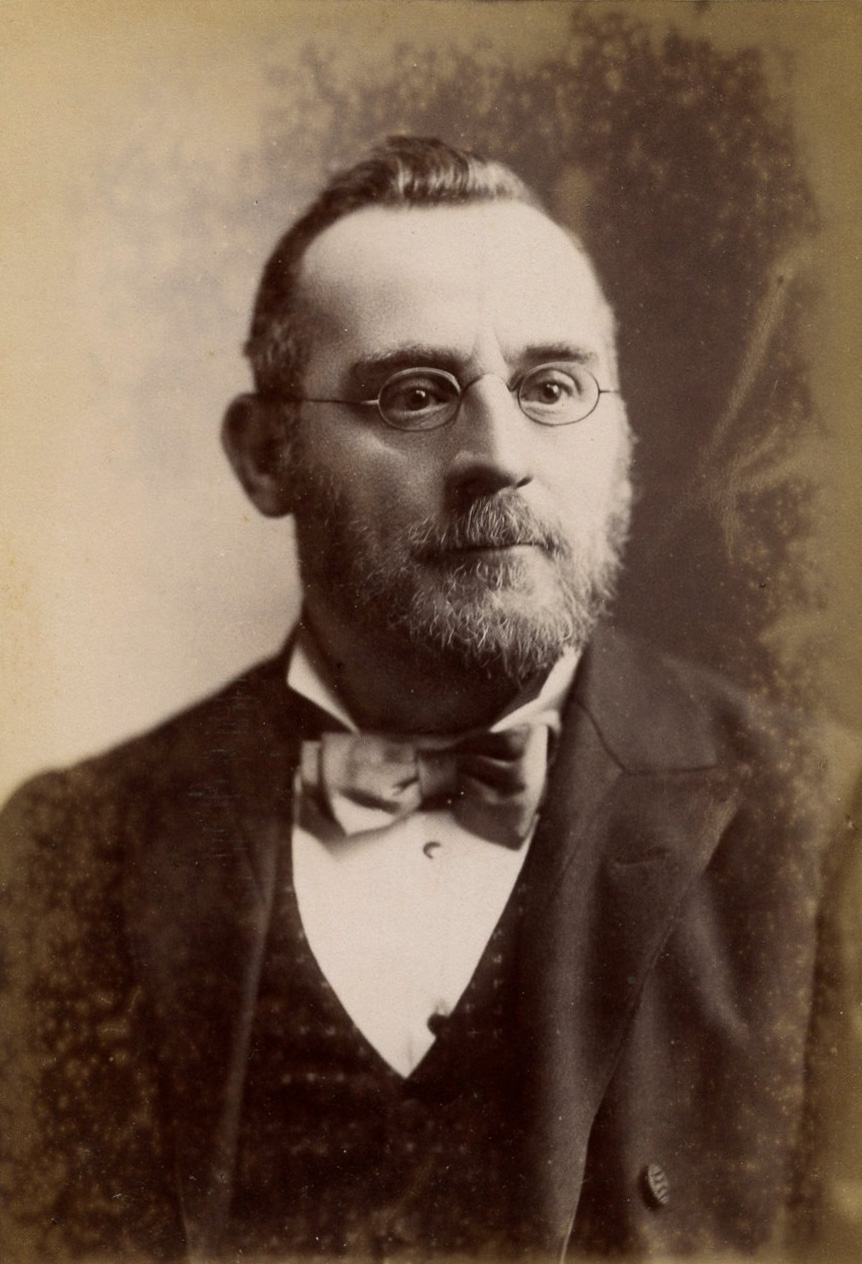
Arthur Corbin Gould, photographed by Charles F. Treble

Arthur Corbin Gould (1850–1903) was an author, avid shooter and member of the Massachusetts Rifle Association. He published The Rifle [Riling 1160] in 1885. After Gould's death, The Rifle was acquired as an official publication of the National Rifle Association of America becoming American Rifleman. Mr. Gould also authored The Modern American Pistol and Revolver, including a description of modern pistols and revolvers of American make; ammunition used in these arms; results accomplished; and shooting rules followed by American marksmen as well as Modern American Rifles. The former was the first English-language book devoted to pistol shooting.

== Bibliography ==
- The Modern American Pistol and Revolver, Boston, A.C. Gould & Co., 1888. [Riling 1220]
- Modern American Rifles, Boston, Bradlee Widden, 1892. [Riling 1309]
- Modern American Pistols and Revolvers, Boston, Bradlee Widden, 1894. [Riling 1220]
- American Rifleman's Encyclopedia, Cincinnati, Peters Cartridge Co., 1902. [Riling 1539]
- Sport; or, Fishing and Shooting (189?)
- (1903). "Arthur Corbin Gould." Western Field. San Francisco
