= Charles F. Treble =

British photographer (1857–1932)

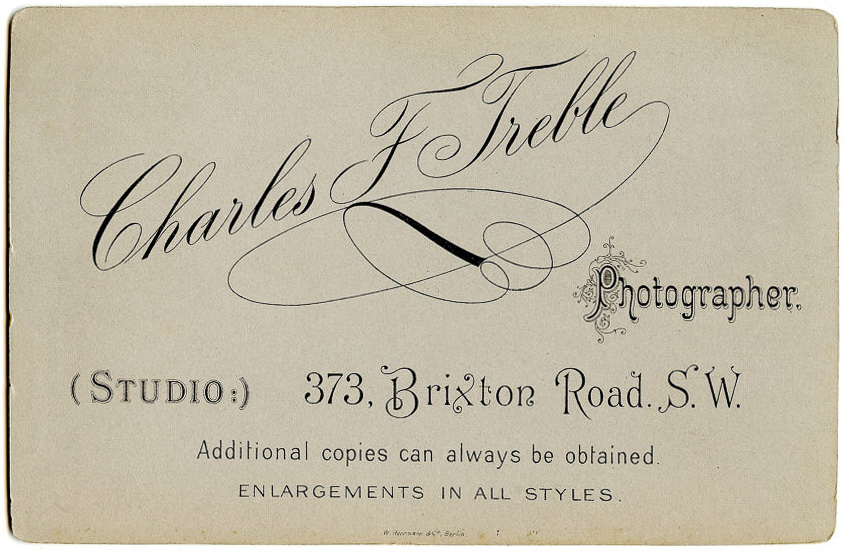
- Cabinet card of Charles F. Treble
- Born: 1857; Coventry, England
- Died: 30 July 1932 (aged 74–75); Alta Gracia, Argentina
- Other name: C. F. Treble
- Occupation: Photographer

Charles Frederick Treble (1857 – 30 July 1932) was a British photographer.

== Early life ==
Treble was born in 1857 in Coventry, England to Frederick and Elizabeth Treble. His father Frederick was himself a well-known artist and photographer. His younger brother Edward Montague Treble also followed the family trade, establishing himself in London and Worcestershire.

== Career ==
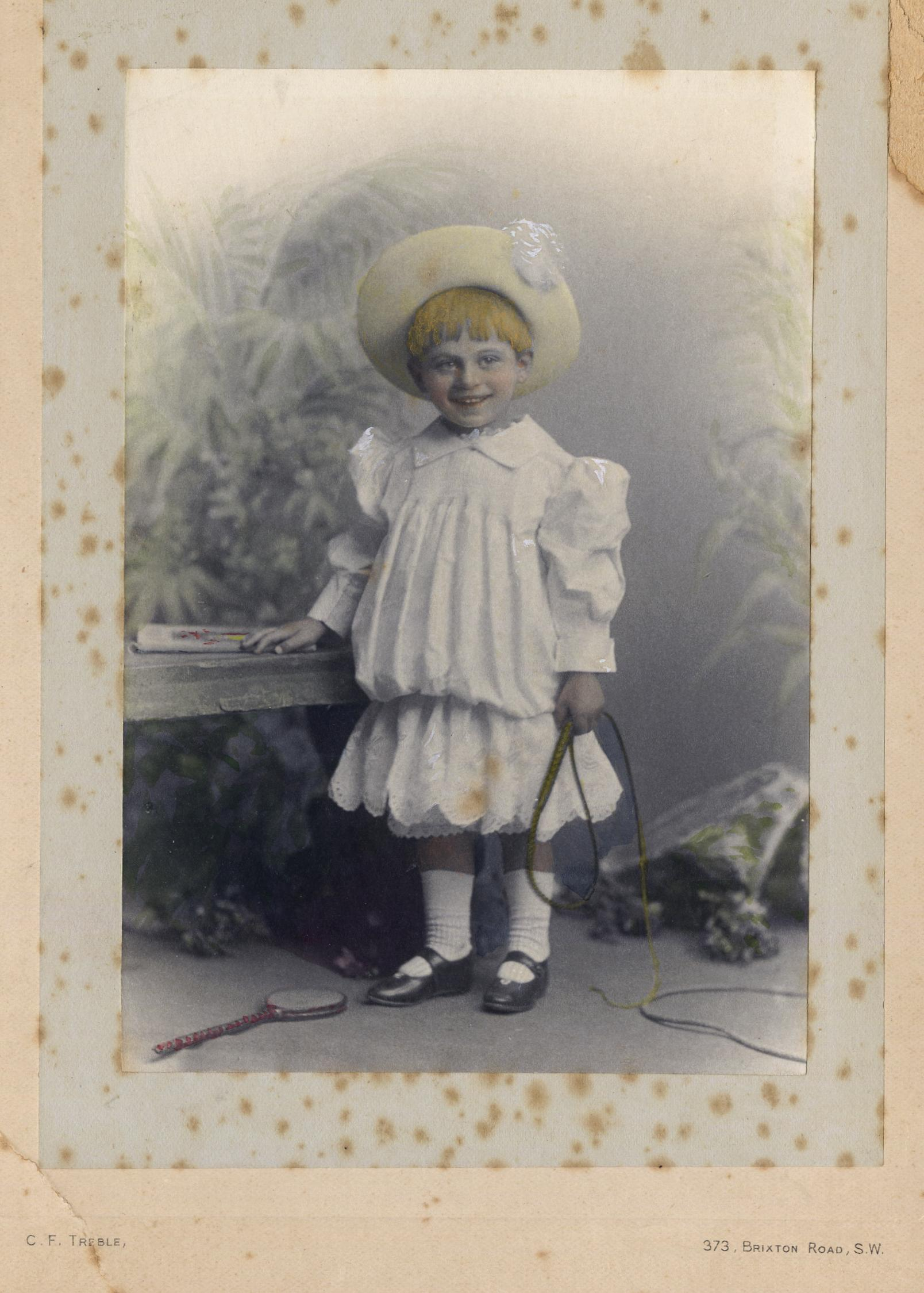
Walt Mott, a hand-tinted photograph of a small child by Treble

Treble was trained as an artist in Chelsea and then as a photographer in Battersea. Based primarily in London, he had studios on Stockbridge Street and Victoria Street in Belgravia, Brixton Road in Brixton, and Queens Parade in Clapham. He also had studios in Norwich and Great Yarmouth.

In 1892, Treble exhibited at the 37th Photographic Society of Great Britain Exhibition. His works featured included Geraldine, Three three-quarter-length Studies, Studies of Ladies' Heads, and Six Studies of Children's Heads.

Treble's works include his portrait of Arthur Corbin Gould, his portraits of the family of Queen Victoria, his portrait of Thomas Holdich, his portrait of an unknown young woman held by the National Trust's Fox Talbot Museum, his portrait of John Burns, his portrait of William Peall, his portrait of Sir Francis Clifton held by the Western Australian Museum, and his portraits of Muriel McDonald and Flora McDonald held by the National Portrait Gallery.

== Death ==
Treble died on 30 July 1932 in Alta Gracia, Argentina.
