= She's the One (World Party song) =

1997 song covered by Robbie Williams

- UK promotional CD single

Promotional single by World Party

from the album Egyptology
- Released: 16 June 1997
- Length: 4:56
- Label: Chrysalis (UK); The Enclave (US)
- Songwriter: Karl Wallinger
- Producer: Karl Wallinger

World Party singles chronology
"Beautiful Dream" (1997)	"She's the One" (1997)	"Call Me Up (promotional only)" (1997)

Audio
- "She's the One" on YouTube

"She's the One" is a song by the British rock band World Party. It was written and produced by Karl Wallinger for World Party's fourth studio album, Egyptology (1997) and released as a promotional single. It won an Ivor Novello Award in 1997.

The English singer Robbie Williams recorded a cover of "She's the One" for his second album, I've Been Expecting You (1998). It was released in November 1999 and reached number one on the UK singles chart. It was certified platinum.

== World Party version ==
"She's the One" was written by Karl Wallinger for World Party's fourth studio album, Egyptology (1997). It was released as a promotional single. The keyboardist, Guy Chambers, felt it was unfinished, likening it to a demo, and said it was "thrown together in one night". It won an Ivor Novello Award in 1997.

== Robbie Williams version ==
"She's the One"

Single by Robbie Williams

from the album I've Been Expecting You
- A-side: "It's Only Us"
- B-side: "Coke & Tears"
- Released: 8 November 1999
- Length: 4:18
- Label: Chrysalis
- Songwriter: Karl Wallinger
- Producers: Guy Chambers; Steve Power

Robbie Williams singles chronology
"Strong" (1999)	"She's the One" / "It's Only Us" (1999)	"Win Some Lose Some" (2000)

Music video
- "She's the One" on YouTube

Without Wallinger's knowledge, the English singer Robbie Williams recorded a version with Chambers and Wallinger's touring band. It was included on his 1998 album I've Been Expecting You and released as a single on 8 November 1999. It was Williams's second ballad after the success of his 1997 single "Angels". It was included on the 1999 compilation album The Ego Has Landed.

Wallinger was irritated that his band had recorded a version with Williams without his knowledge and that Williams had changed the lyrics. However, he said it had made him a large amount in royalties, which was helpful after he suffered an aneurysm in 2001.

=== Music video ===
In the video, Williams is a coach to an ice skating couple portrayed by Pamela O'Connor and Jonathon O'Dougherty. When the male skater is injured during practice, Williams takes his place for the final and wins the highest scores. The video ends with Williams and the female skater celebrating with the male skater, who has been watching from the sidelines. The UK version features commentary by the sports commentator Barry Davies.

=== Reception ===
"She's the One" reached number one on the UK singles chart on 14 November. It was Williams's second number one after his 1998 single "Millennium" and became one of his signature songs. Reviewing The Ego Has Landed, Pitchfork dismissed it as "Bob Seger's 'Night Moves' with a few minor alterations", while Rob Sheffield in Rolling Stone called it a "top-notch puppy-love ballad".

"She's the One" won awards including 2000 Brit Awards for British Single of the Year and British Video of the Year in 2000 and Capital Radio Award for Best Single. In 2022, the Guardian critic Alexis Petridis named "She's the One" the 11th-greatest Williams song, writing: "It's a great song, but Williams's less fragile, less Beatles-y take turned it into the kind of single that goes platinum."

=== Track listings ===
UK CD1

1. "It's Only Us" – 2:50
2. "She's the One" – 4:18
3. "Coke & Tears" – 4:24
4. "It's Only Us" (video)

UK CD2

1. "She's the One" – 4:18
2. "It's Only Us" – 2:50
3. "Millennium" (live at Slane Castle) – 4:40
4. "She's the One" (video)

UK cassette single

1. "She's the One" – 4:18
2. "It's Only Us" – 2:50
3. "Millennium" (live at Slane Castle) – 4:40

=== Credits and personnel ===
Credits are taken from the I've Been Expecting You album booklet.

Studio

- Mastered at Metropolis Mastering

Personnel

- Karl Wallinger – writing
- Robbie Williams – vocals
- Gary Nuttall – background vocals
- Steve McEwan – background vocals, acoustic guitar, electric guitar
- David Catlin-Birch – bass guitar
- Guy Chambers – piano, production, arrangement
- Chris Sharrock – drums
- London Session Orchestra – orchestra
- Gavyn Wright – orchestra leader
- Nick Ingman – orchestral arrangement
- Steve Power – production, recording, mixing, programming
- Steve McNichol – programming
- Steve Price – orchestral engineering
- Tony Cousins – mastering

=== Charts ===
==== Weekly charts ====
Chart (1999–2000)	Peak position
Austria (Ö3 Austria Top 40)	16
Belgium (Ultratop 50 Flanders)	40
Belgium (Ultratop 50 Wallonia)	21
Czech Republic (IFPI)	14
Europe (Eurochart Hot 100)	9
Europe (European Hit Radio)	3
Finland (Suomen virallinen lista)	13
France (SNEP)	74
Germany (GfK)	27
Greece (IFPI)	1
Iceland (Íslenski Listinn Topp 40)	8
Ireland (IRMA)	4
Italy (FIMI)	6
Italy (Musica e dischi)	4
Latvia (Latvijas Top 40)	14
Netherlands (Dutch Top 40)	29
Netherlands (Single Top 100)	33
New Zealand (Recorded Music NZ) with "It's Only Us"	3
Paraguay (El Siglo de Torreón)	7
Scottish Singles Sales (Official Charts) with "It's Only Us"	1
Sweden (Sverigetopplistan)	42
Switzerland (Schweizer Hitparade)	20
UK Singles (Official Charts) with "It's Only Us"	1
UK Airplay (Music Week)	1

==== Year-end charts ====
Chart (1999)	Position
Europe (European Hit Radio)	85
Netherlands (Dutch Top 40)	191
UK Singles (OCC)	48
UK Airplay (Music Week)	17

Chart (2000)	Position
UK Airplay (Music Week)	26

=== Certifications ===
Region	Certification	Certified units/sales
Italy (FIMI)	Gold	50,000^{‡}
New Zealand (RMNZ)	Platinum	30,000^{‡}
United Kingdom (BPI)	Platinum	781,000
^{‡} Sales+streaming figures based on certification alone.
