= Private Revolution =

1986 studio album by World Party

Studio album by World Party
- Released: September 1, 1986
- Recorded: January–March 1986
- Studio: Baby'O Recorders (Hollywood)
- Length: 44:48
- Label: Chrysalis
- Producer: Karl Wallinger

World Party chronology
Private Revolution (1986)	Goodbye Jumbo (1990)

Singles from Private Revolution
- 1. "Private Revolution" Released: 1986; 2. "Ship of Fools" Released: 25 November 1986; 3. "All Come True" Released: 1987

Professional ratings
Review scores
Source	Rating
AllMusic	3/5 stars
Q	4/5 stars
The Rolling Stone Album Guide	3/5 stars
The Village Voice	C

Private Revolution is the debut album by the Welsh-British rock band World Party, released on September 1, 1986. At this point, singer-songwriter/multi-instrumentalist Karl Wallinger was the only member of World Party, and the only person pictured on the cover.

Wallinger began work on Private Revolution after his departure from The Waterboys in 1985. The sessions were conducted at Wallinger's home studio primarily with a guitar and a drum machine. He is assisted on this album by several session musicians, including Anthony Thistlethwaite, Steve Wickham and Sinéad O'Connor. Several other musicians listed in the credits are actually whimsically named pseudonyms for Wallinger himself.

== Track listing ==
All tracks are written by Karl Wallinger, except where noted.

No.	Title	Writer(s)	Length
1.	"Private Revolution"		4:01
2.	"Making Love (To the World)"		2:30
3.	"Ship of Fools"		4:27
4.	"All Come True"		5:52
5.	"Dance of the Hoppy Lads"	Wallinger, Steve Wickham	0:44
6.	"It Can Be Beautiful (Sometimes)"		3:00
7.	"The Ballad of the Little Man"		5:02
8.	"Hawaiian Island World"		4:20
9.	"All I Really Want to Do"	Bob Dylan	4:43
10.	"World Party"		4:36
11.	"It's All Mine"		5:33
Total length:			44:48

== Personnel ==
World Party

- Karl Wallinger – vocals, guitars, bass, sampling keyboards, drum programming

with:

- Rufus Dove – guitars (probably a pseudonym for Wallinger - pun on "rufous dove")
- Will Towyn – sampling keyboards (probably a pseudonym for Wallinger - pun on "will to win")
- Delahaye – percussion (possibly a pseudonym for Wallinger, or for Mike Scott - this is an alias also used on several Waterboys albums)
- Millennium Mills – piano (probably a pseudonym for Wallinger - name taken from Millennium Mills building in London Docklands)
- Ahmed Gottlieb – sitar and tabla (probably a pseudonym for Wallinger)

=== Special guests ===
- Anthony Thistlethwaite – saxophone (3)
- Stephen Wickham – violin (4, 5)
- Martin Finnucane – harp (5) (probably a pseudonym for Wallinger - this is the name of a character in the Flann O'Brien novel The Third Policeman)
- Sinéad O'Connor – backing vocals (8)

=== Technical ===
- Produced by Karl Wallinger
- Cover photography – Steve Wallace assisted by Mathew Stevens
- Back cover photography – Edward Durdey
- Design – Josh Riley and Stephanie Nash

== Charts ==
Chart (1986–1987)	Position
Australia (Kent Music Report)	13
Canadian Albums Chart	60
New Zealand Albums (RMNZ)	18
UK Albums (Official Charts)	56
US Billboard 200	27
