= American Rifleman =

Shooting hobbyist magazine owned by the NRA

- Categories: Shooting sports
- Frequency: Monthly
- Publisher: National Rifle Association of America
- Total circulation: 1,560,149 (2021)
- Founded: 1923; 103 years ago
- Country: United States
- Based in: Fairfax, Virginia
- Language: English
- Website: americanrifleman.org
- ISSN: 0003-083X

American Rifleman is a United States–based monthly shooting and firearms interest publication, owned by the National Rifle Association of America (NRA). It is the 33rd-most-widely-distributed consumer magazine and the NRA's primary magazine. The magazine has its headquarters in Fairfax, Virginia.

== History ==
Arthur Corbin Gould, an avid shooter and member of the Massachusetts Rifle Association, published The Rifle in 1885 as an effort to focus discussion on the sport of rifle shooting. The Rifle later changed its title to Shooting and Fishing in 1888, branching out into other outdoor sports. In 1894, while the magazine was titled Shooting and Fishing, Gould attended the National Rifle Association matches held at Sea Girt and was impressed with the level of competition, leading him to write several editorials urging the public to join. This call eventually led to the revitalization of the NRA and established a board of directors to help manage the nationwide organization.

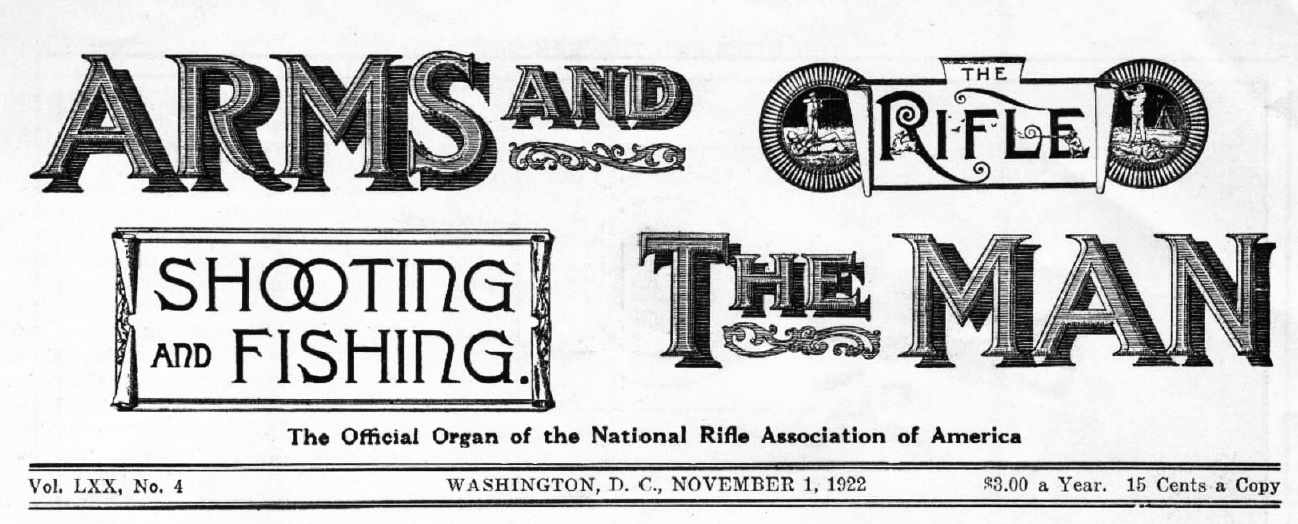
A 1922 masthead of Arms and the Man incorporating the previous titles

Following Gould's death in 1903, Shooting and Fishing deteriorated. There had been no official connection between the NRA and the magazine, but Gould's prominence in the shooting world had helped establish and lend credibility to the organization as it tried to gain national footing. In 1906, James A. Drain, then Secretary of the NRA, purchased the magazine and renamed it Arms and the Man, becoming its editor and publisher. Two years later, as President of the NRA, Drain moved both the magazine and the NRA—officially two distinct entities—back to Washington D.C. in order to establish closer ties with the political aspects of rifle shooting. Though there was still no explicit tie between the magazine and the NRA, their relationship was extremely close.

In 1916, seven years after the end of his NRA presidency, James A. Drain decided to part with the magazine in order to fully devote himself to his law practice, though Arms and the Man had become the top magazine of its kind. At first, Drain tried unsuccessfully to sell the magazine to his former staff writer, Frank J. Kahrs, who had since moved on to Remington Arms, but Kahrs suggested instead that Drain offer the magazine to the NRA, since Arms and the Man had effectively become an unofficial NRA journal. On July 1, 1916, James A. Drain sold Arms and the Man to the NRA for $1. Fred H. Phillips took over as editor, and Kendrick Scofield as associate editor, and, due to Drain's close ties to the organization, though there was a transition in leadership, there was no disruption of publication.

Following its move into NRA control, Arms and the Man, which had primarily focused on shooting competition results and discussion of rifles, began to expand into hunting stories, ballistics, handgunning, shotgunning and new shooting products In June 1923, the publication changed its name for the fourth and final time to the current title, The American Rifleman. In the aftermath of the name change, the scale of the magazine widened and four influential writers that would help shape the future of both The American Rifleman and shooting sports in general joined: Julian S. Hatcher, Charles Askins, Townsend Whelen and C. B. Lister. Also during this time, Hatcher began his column "The Dope Bag," a write-in question and answer column, which still continues today. By 1928, "The Dope Bag" had grown to three staff members, answering over 5000 letters that year. The prominence of rifle shooting, as well as the decision to include all NRA members with free copies of the magazine, helped boost the circulation to over 30,000, making the publication self-sustainable for the first time in its history.

Despite the harsh economic climate during the Great Depression in the 1930s, The American Rifleman continued to gain readers, eventually reaching a circulation of 56,000 and carrying its first full-color advertisement from the Packard Car Company.

During World War II, editor Bill Shadel received press credentials from CBS and shipped overseas to cover the European Theater as a War Correspondent for CBS and NRA. His duties were taken over by his associate editors, and The American Rifleman carried articles and interviews by Shadel up until the end of the war. Also during World War II, the physical size of the magazine had to be cut in half due to wartime paper shortages. Due to the poor quality of paper that was used, The American Rifleman began to rely on artwork more heavily than photography. Pulitzer Prize winning cartoonist James T. Berryman was brought in as art director. Following the war, C.B. Lister retained editorship of the magazine.

The American Rifleman continued to develop in scope following World War II. Lee Harvey Oswald killed US President John F. Kennedy with a rifle purchased from a Klein's Sporting Goods ad in the February 1963 issue of American Rifleman. This prompted what the magazine called "a wave of anti-firearm feeling" and an "almost universal demand for tighter controls over the mail-order sales of guns."

In 1966, Ashley Halsey Jr. became editor for the magazine, bringing much more focus to the political realm, given the prominence of the bills proposed by senator Thomas Dodd restricting the sales of firearms across state lines. Halsey Jr. was a former writer at the Saturday Evening Post for 18 years, and became known for his prominent editorials and investigative articles. In 1971, The American Rifleman published a special centennial issue that was 168 pages long, by far the largest in the magazine's history. The centennial edition also included the first full-sized, full-color photographs of firearms ever printed in the magazine. Shortly afterward, in October 1973, hunting stories, reviews and tips were spun out into a separate publication, American Hunter, which was operating profitably within two years of its premiere. In 1997, the NRA launched another magazine titled American Guardian that focused political activism and rebranded it as America's First Freedom in June 2000 to focus explicitly on protecting gun rights.

== Content ==
The magazine is one of four NRA-owned magazines included with an NRA membership, although discounted memberships with no magazine subscription are available.

Each issue contains reviews of different firearms, historical articles about firearms, technical information about reloading, notes from the President of the NRA and a column called "The Armed Citizen" which lists specific events of people defending themselves with a firearm successfully.
