= Reggae Gold 2012 =

Compilation album by Various artists
- Released: June 26, 2012
- Genre: Reggae, dancehall, lovers rock
- Label: VP Records

Reggae Gold 2012 is a compilation reggae album from VP Records. It was released on June 26, 2012 and Reggae Gold is an annual series from VP Records. It was launched in 1992. This Reggae Gold 2012 is the 20th edition of the series and it is a double disc CD which commemorates the series’ 20th anniversary. Since 1992, Reggae Gold has been a popular series and a big seller for VP Records. A series select each year’s most popular tunes of dancehall, roots, reggae, lovers rock.

The first disc featured the recent hits, including Konshens’ “Gal a Bubble” and ”Do Sum'n”, Popcaan’s “Only Man She Want”, Busy Signal’s “Come Over (Missing You)”, Cham’s “Wine”, Sean Paul’s “She Doesn't Mind”, Potential Kidd’s “Yah Suh Nice”, Christopher Martin’s “Cheater's Prayer”, Tarrus Riley’s “Not Missing You”, Gyptian’s “Overtime” and more.

The second disc is a selection of classic hits from the past years, since 1992. Disc 2 featured artists are: Wayne Wonder, Gyptian, Sean Paul, Beenie Man, Bounty Killer, General Degree, Mr. Vegas, Mavado, Beres Hammond & Buju Banton, I Wayne, Sizzla, Tanya Stephens, Queen Ifrica, Lady Saw, T.O.K., Morgan Heritage, Terry Linen. Reggae Gold 2012 has been on the Billboard Top 200 chart and got a first place on the Reggae Album chart.

== Executive producer ==
Chris Chin

=== Disc 1 ===
No.	Title	Writer(s)	Producer(s)	Length
1.	"She Doesn't Mind - Sean Paul"	S. Henriques / J. Henriques / B. Levin / Shellback	Benny Blanco / Shellback	3:47
2.	"Only Man She Want - Popcaan"	A.Sutherland / S.Howden / E.Redwood	Elvis Redwood	3:21
3.	"Yah Suh Nice - Potential Kidd"	Dwyane Taylor / Orlando Francis	Kingsley Daley	2:43
4.	"Gal A Bubble - Konshens"	M.Collinder / G.Spence	Mark Colinder / Garfield Spence	3:31
5.	"Cheater's Prayer - Christopher Martin"	C.Martin / C.Birch / S.Chablal	Shaun "Zj Chrome" Chablal	3:23
6.	"Come Over (Missing You) - Busy Signal"	R.Gordon / W.Thompson / K.Bennett / L.Brown / P.James / K.Webster / R.Gordon / D.Dennis	Wayne "Unga" Thompson	5:17
7.	"Reggae - Etana"	S.McKenzie / S.Hayden / J.Adeleman / S.Brown	Shane C. Brown / Stanley "Rellee" Hayden	5:49
8.	"Will I Wait In Vain - Iba Mahr"	M.Greaves / R.McDermott / J.Edwards / D.Dennis / M.Miller / N.Davey	Roland McDermott / Jermaine Edwards	4:18
9.	"Kingston Town (Remix) - Busy Signal featuring Damian Jr. Gong Marley"	R.Gordon / D.Marley / S.Brown / H.Lawes / B.Brown	Shane C. Brown	3:43
10.	"I Know Better - Romain Virgo"	R.Virgo / S.Brown / K.Bennett / L.Savory / A.Hoilett	Shane C. Brown	4:16
11.	"Do Sum'n - Konshens"	G.Spence / A.Gray / K.Macarthy	Andre "Suku" Gray / Kunley Macarthy	3:38
12.	"Wine - Cham featuring O"	E.Mitchell / P.Mitchell (Jr) / P.Mitchell (Snr.) / D.Beckett	Paul "Cashflow" Mitchell	3:46
13.	"Overtime - Gyptian"	W.Edwards / J.Arison	Justus Arison	3:09
14.	"Like I Love You - Melanie Fiona"	D.Chin-Quee / M.Chin / J.Gilbert / S.Barthe / L.Boyd	Dwayne "Supa Dups" Chin-Quee	4:25
15.	"Not Missing You - Tarrus Riley"	O.Rilet / R.Marshall / E.Smith	Dean "Cannon" Fraser	4:10
16.	"Keep it Real - Beres Hammond"	Hugh Hammond / Ivor Lindo / Lowell Dunbar / Robert Shakespeare / Robert Lyn / C.Dodd	Willie Lindo	3:44
17.	"I Look To You - Terry Linen"	R.S. Kelly	Lloyd & Mitchelle Campbell & Jason Sterling	3:57

=== Disc 2 ===
No.	Title	Writer(s)	Producer(s)	Length
1.	"No Letting Go - Wayne Wonder"	S.Marsden / V. W. Charles	Steven "Lenky" Marsden	3:22
2.	"Hold You - Gyptian"	Windel Edwards	Windel Edwards / Imran "Kyle" Passard	3:53
3.	"Temperature - Sean Paul"	S.Hentiques / R.Fuller / A.Marshall	Rohan "Jah Snowcone" Fuller	3:36
4.	"Romie - Beenie Man"	S.Marsden / M.Davis / A.Thompson	The Shocking Vibes Crew	3:47
5.	"Benz And Bimma - Bounty Killer"	R.Price / I.Williams / P.Yebuah	Aiden Jones	3:46
6.	"When I Hold You Tonight - General Degree"	C.Butt / W.Johnson / C.Browne	Steely & Clevie	3:05
7.	"Heads High - Mr. Vegas"	C.Smith / H.Browne	Danny Browne	3:29
8.	"So Special - Mavado"	D.Brooks / D.Kelly	Linton T.J. White	3:00
9.	"Pull It Up - Beres Hammond & Buju Banton"	H.Hammond / M.Myrie / C.S.Dodd	Donovan Germain	3:32
10.	"Can't Satisfy Her - I Wayne"	Patrick Henry	C.Taylor / O.Hibbert	3:42
11.	"Just One Of Those Days - Sizzla"	M.Collins / D.Dennis / P.Crossdale / K.Bennett	Bobby "Digital" Dixon	3:29
12.	"It's A Pity - Tanya Stephens"	V.Stephenson / P.Baigorry / J.Bugnon / L.Topp	Pionear	4:15
13.	"Below The Waist - Queen Ifrica"	V.Morgan / I.Lindo / D.Brown	Donovan Germain	3:33
14.	"Healing - Lady Saw featuring Beenie Man"	M.Hall / M.Davis / P.Roberts / A.Thomas / D.Dennis/ S.Marsden	Patrick Roberts	3:31
15.	"Footprints - T. O. K."	X.Davidson / C.Thompson / A.Mccalla / R.Clarke / D.Bennett / N.Staff / W.Morris	Tony "Donovan Bennett"	3:31
16.	"Down By The River - Morgan Heritage"	M.Morgan / N.Morgan / P.Morgan / R.Morgan / U.Morgan / C.Dodd / K.Drummond	Dean "Cannon" Fraser	3:49
