= Way Down Now =

1990 single by World Party

Single by World Party

from the album Goodbye Jumbo
- B-side: "Nature Girl"
- Released: 20 August 1990
- Length: 3:49
- Label: Chrysalis; Ensign
- Songwriter: Karl Wallinger
- Producer: Karl Wallinger

World Party singles chronology
"Put the Message in the Box" (1990)	"Way Down Now" (1990)	"Thank You World" (1991)

"Way Down Now" is a song by British musical group World Party. It was released as the first single from their 1990 album, Goodbye Jumbo, on 20 August 1990 in the United Kingdom. The song contains a nod to "Sympathy for the Devil" by the Rolling Stones. The song topped the US Billboard Modern Rock Tracks chart, reached No. 21 on the Album Rock Tracks chart, and peaked at No. 10 in the Netherlands.

== Formats and track listings ==
All songs were written by Karl Wallinger except where noted.

European 7-inch single (113 381)

1. "Way Down Now" – 3:49
2. "Nature Girl" – 4:59

European maxi-CD single (663 381)

1. "Way Down Now" – 3:49
2. "You're All Invited to the Party" – 4:30
3. "Happiness Is a Warm Gun (John Lennon, Paul McCartney)" – 2:28
4. "Nature Girl" – 4:59

== Charts ==
=== Weekly charts ===
Chart (1990)	Peak position
Australia (ARIA)	114
Canada Top Singles (RPM)	53
Netherlands (Dutch Top 40)	10
Netherlands (Single Top 100)	17
UK Singles (Official Charts)	66
US Album Rock Tracks (Billboard)	21
US Modern Rock Tracks (Billboard)	1

=== Year-end charts ===
Chart (1990)	Position
US Modern Rock Tracks (Billboard)	10

== Release history ==
Region	Date	Format(s)	Label(s)	Ref.
United Kingdom	20 August 1990	7-inch vinyl; 12-inch vinyl; CD; cassette	Chrysalis; Ensign	
United Kingdom	10 September 1990	7-inch vinyl with badge	Chrysalis; Ensign	
Australia	1 October 1990	7-inch vinyl; cassette	Chrysalis; Ensign	
