= Watch How the People Dancing: Unity Sounds from the London Dancehall 1986–1989 =

Compilation album by various artists
- Released: 28 January 2003
- Genre: Dancehall; reggae
- Length: 1:07:29
- Label: Honest Jon's
- Producer: Red Eye; Ribs; Ruddy Ranks

Watch How the People Dancing: Unity Sounds from the London Dancehall 1986–1989 is a compilation album released on 28 January 2003 through Honest Jon's record label. The album features dancehall singles released through British Unity Sounds record label in 1980s and documents the genre's transition into modern digital dancehall, focusing on the British scene.

== Background ==
The album was recorded by the Unity Sound label workers after the introduction of the early digital sound system. The rhythm tracks were recorded by a Casio keyboard and a four-track cassette recorder, which were later supplemented by vocals and overdubs in the studio. Prior to being released as singles, all the tracks here were tested on the Unity sound system.

Majority of the tracks also contain an instrumental version. The tracks "Pick a Sound" by Selah Collins and "Watch How the People Dancing" by Kenny Knots became early hits in the scene.

== Critical reception ==
Professional ratings
Review scores
Source	Rating
AllMusic	4/5 stars
Entertainment Weekly	B

The compilation generally received positive reviews from critics. AllMusic critic Chris Nickson described the album's style as "true street-level British reggae from the dawn of the digital era, and all surprisingly good, given that none of the people involved were really musicians." Entertainment Weekly stated that the album is "not the best of the era (see Barrington Levy), but a sweet, bouncy snapshot of a pungent regional scene."

== Track listing ==
All tracks are written by Ruddy Ranks, Red Eye and Ribs except where noted

No.	Title	Writer(s)	Artist(s)	Length
1.	"Pick a Sound"	Selah Collins; Ranks; Red Eye; Ribs	Selah Collins	3:26
2.	"Version"		Selah Collins	3:13
3.	"We Try"	Miley Murka; Ranks; Red Eye; Ribs	Mikey Murka	3:16
4.	"Version"		Mikey Murka	2:49
5.	"What a Wonderful Feeling"	Errol Bellot; Ranks; Red Eye; Ribs	Errol Bellot	3:15
6.	"Watch How the People Dancing"	Kenny Knots; Ranks; Red Eye; Ribs	Kenny Knots	3:28
7.	"Lean Boot"	Richie Davis; Ranks; Red Eye; Ribs	Richie Davis	3:05
8.	"Version"		Richie Davis	3:01
9.	"Ready for the Dancehall Tonight"	Peter Bouncer; Ranks; Red Eye; Ribs	Peter Bouncer	4:00
10.	"Version"		Peter Bouncer	3:10
11.	"You Ha Fe Cool"	Davis; Ranks; Red Eye; Ribs	Richie Davis	3:04
12.	"Version"		Richie Davis	2:59
13.	"Ring My Number"	Knots; Ranks; Red Eye; Ribs	Kenny Knots	3:21
14.	"Version"		Kenny Knots	3:16
15.	"Back Your Automatic"	Murka; Ranks; Red Eye; Ribs	Mikey Murka	3:08
16.	"Control The Dancehall"	Murka; Ranks; Red Eye; Ribs	Mikey Murka	3:16
17.	"Version"		Mikey Murka	2:59
18.	"Chuck It"	Demon Rockers; Ranks; Red Eye; Ribs	Jack Wilson and Demon Rockers	3:00
19.	"Ride the Rhythm"	Murka; Ranks; Red Eye; Ribs	Mikey Murka	3:19
20.	"Version"		Mikey Murka	3:01
21.	"Run Come Call Me"	Knots; Ranks; Red Eye; Ribs	Kenny Knots	3:23
Total length:				1:07:29

== Personnel ==
- Ruddy Ranks – production, composition
- Red Eye – production, composition
- Ribs – production, composition
- Will Bankhead – artwork, photography
- Mark Ainley – compiling
- Tom Benson – compiling
- Trevor Lewis – photography
- Moritz von Oswald – mastering
