= World Party =

Welsh/English musical group (1985–2015)

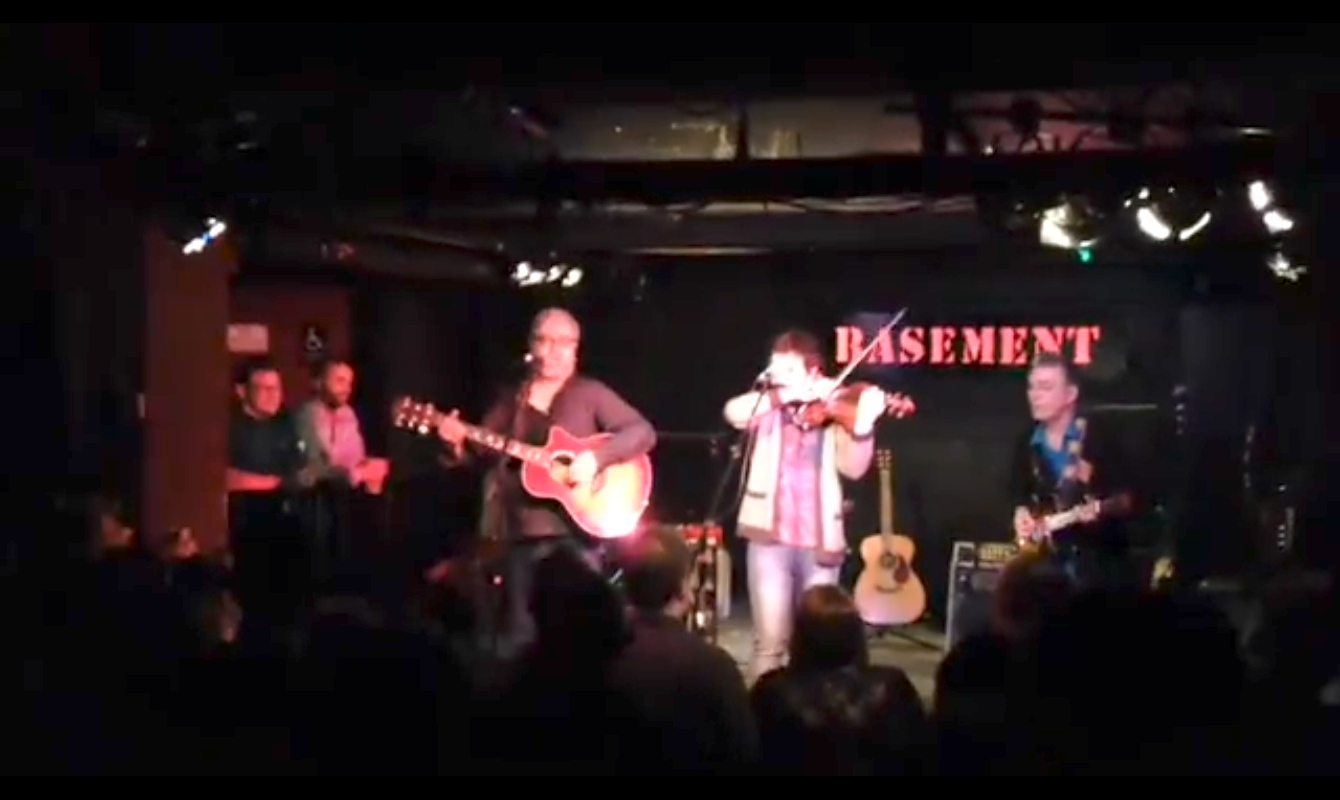
- World Party performing in May 2015

Background information
- Origin: London, England
- Genres: Alternative rock, indie pop, folk rock, power pop, psychedelic pop
- Years active: 1985–2015
- Labels: Ensign, Chrysalis, Papillon
- Past members: Karl Wallinger; Dave Catlin-Birch; Chris Sharrock; Guy Chambers; Jeff Trott; Amanda Kramer; John Turnbull; David Duffy
- Website: www.worldparty.net

World Party was a musical group, predominantly the solo project of its sole consistent member, the songwriter, producer and multi-instrumentalist Karl Wallinger. Wallinger started the band in 1985 in London after leaving the Waterboys. At various times, World Party also featured Guy Chambers, David Catlin-Birch, future Oasis drummer Chris Sharrock, Jeff Trott, Amanda Kramer and John Turnbull.

World Party produced several hit singles during the late 1980s and early 1990s including "Ship of Fools", "Way Down Now", "Put the Message in the Box" and "Is It Like Today?" The band also released the original version of "She's the One", a UK number one hit in 1999 for Robbie Williams.

== Career ==
=== Pre-World Party ===
Wallinger was born in Prestatyn. He received classical music training in piano and oboe as a child at both Eton College and Charterhouse School, before switching his allegiance fully to pop and rock music. Following initial stints in Prestatyn with the short-lived bands Pax and Quasimodo, he moved to London in the late 1970s and entered a five-year "lost period" during which he worked in music publishing, had a stint as musical director of a West End production of The Rocky Horror Show, and played in a funk band called The Out. By the end of this period, he'd also mastered all of the instruments needed for him to become a one-man rock band, as well as the arts of record production and synthesizer programming.

In 1983, Wallinger joined his first notable band, the Waterboys, initially as a keyboard player. Having contributed one organ part to the band's debut album, and many more piano and organ parts to the second (A Pagan Place) as well as playing on tour, his additional skills made him the perfect ally for Waterboys leader Mike Scott when Scott wished to expand the sound of the band for their third album, 1985's This Is the Sea. Wallinger co-produced many of the album tracks, adding assorted synthesizer and sampler arrangements as well as backing vocals, synth bass, percussion, and piano and organ. He also wrote the original music for the opening track, "Don't Bang the Drum".

Despite the productivity of the sessions for This is the Sea, growing rivalry between Scott and Wallinger led to tensions between the two on the subsequent tour, exacerbated by the fact that Wallinger had been writing his own songs from an early age and saw no opportunity to be able to play and sing them while in The Waterboys, which was entirely dominated by Scott's artistic vision. Now armed with his own record contract with the Waterboys' record label, Ensign, Wallinger left the band at the end of the This is the Sea tour in 1985.

=== Private Revolution ===
The first World Party album, Private Revolution, was recorded in a dilapidated former rectory in Woburn, which Wallinger had moved into after quitting both London and The Waterboys. Inspired by Prince, Wallinger recorded the majority of the instruments (guitars, bass, keyboards, drums, samplers) by himself, as well as singing lead vocals and handling programming and production. There were guest appearances on the record by two Waterboys members, saxophonist Anthony Thistlethwaite and fiddle player Steve Wickham. To create the illusion of a full band, Wallinger credited his own instrumental parts to a variety of imaginary players with whimsical names, including "Millennium Mills", "Rufus Dove" and "Will Towyn". During this time, he also worked on Sinéad O'Connor's debut album The Lion and the Cobra, and she in turn sang backing vocals on the song "Hawaiian Island World" as well as appearing in the promotional video for the album's title track.

Wallinger's efforts rapidly drew further music business attention. "They'd heard there was a dumb kid in Woburn writing hits," Wallinger recalled in 2021. "There was this beauty-parade of visiting managers." Wallinger signed a management deal with Prince's manager Steve Fargnoli: "I was a sucker for Prince. I was like, "Take me to Minneapolis. Take me to your leader."

Private Revolution was released in 1986 and displayed Wallinger's eclectic mastery of rock, pop, folk, and funk. The album's first single "Ship of Fools", reached a modest number 42 in the British charts but did much better outside the UK – it reached No. 4 in Australia, No. 21 in New Zealand, and No. 27 in the US, in the process becoming the act's only major international hit. "Private Revolution" was also issued as a single, but only charted in the UK (at No. 107).

"I'm not retro. I'm writing songs about now – in fact, the songs I wrote back then are even more relevant now than they were when I wrote them. I wasn't trying to be ahead of the curve, I was just writing about things that seemed obvious to me at the time, and we still haven't done anything about it."

— Karl Wallinger, 2012

=== Breakthrough and peak years – Goodbye Jumbo and Bang! ===
Relocating to a 32-track studio in London (which he called "Seaview"), Wallinger began work on the second World Party album, Goodbye Jumbo. As with Private Revolution, he played almost all of the instruments himself. In 2000, recalling his songwriting aims at the time, Wallinger explained "I wanted to personify the world and sing about her. I always thought it would have been great if Otis Redding's "Try a Little Tenderness" had been about the planet. Plus, if I stand on top of a mountain Julie Andrews-style, the hills do seem to be alive with the sound of music. You can say whatever you like about eco whatever, but if you fuck up the environment you’re going to die."

On some of the tracks, Wallinger collaborated with fellow former Waterboy and songwriter Guy Chambers, who had originally joined the project in 1986 for live and studio work. Sessions were lengthy, carried out during the night and fuelled by copious amounts of marijuana, with Chambers later remembering "if you worked with Karl you had to get into his headspace. Everything was very slow and you had to be extremely patient. I was one of Karl’s principal cheerleaders at that point. We laughed a lot and I learned a lot from him, particularly about lyrics, but he was a terrible procrastinator and still is now." For his part, Wallinger would credit Chambers as being "the pushy guy who would cue me into the corner pocket. I’ve got to thank him for that."

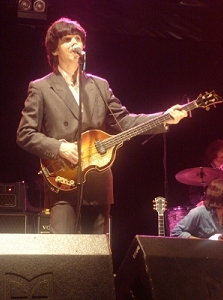
Dave Catlin-Birch (pictured as Paul McCartney in the Bootleg Beatles in 2006) served as bassist from 1992 to 1995.

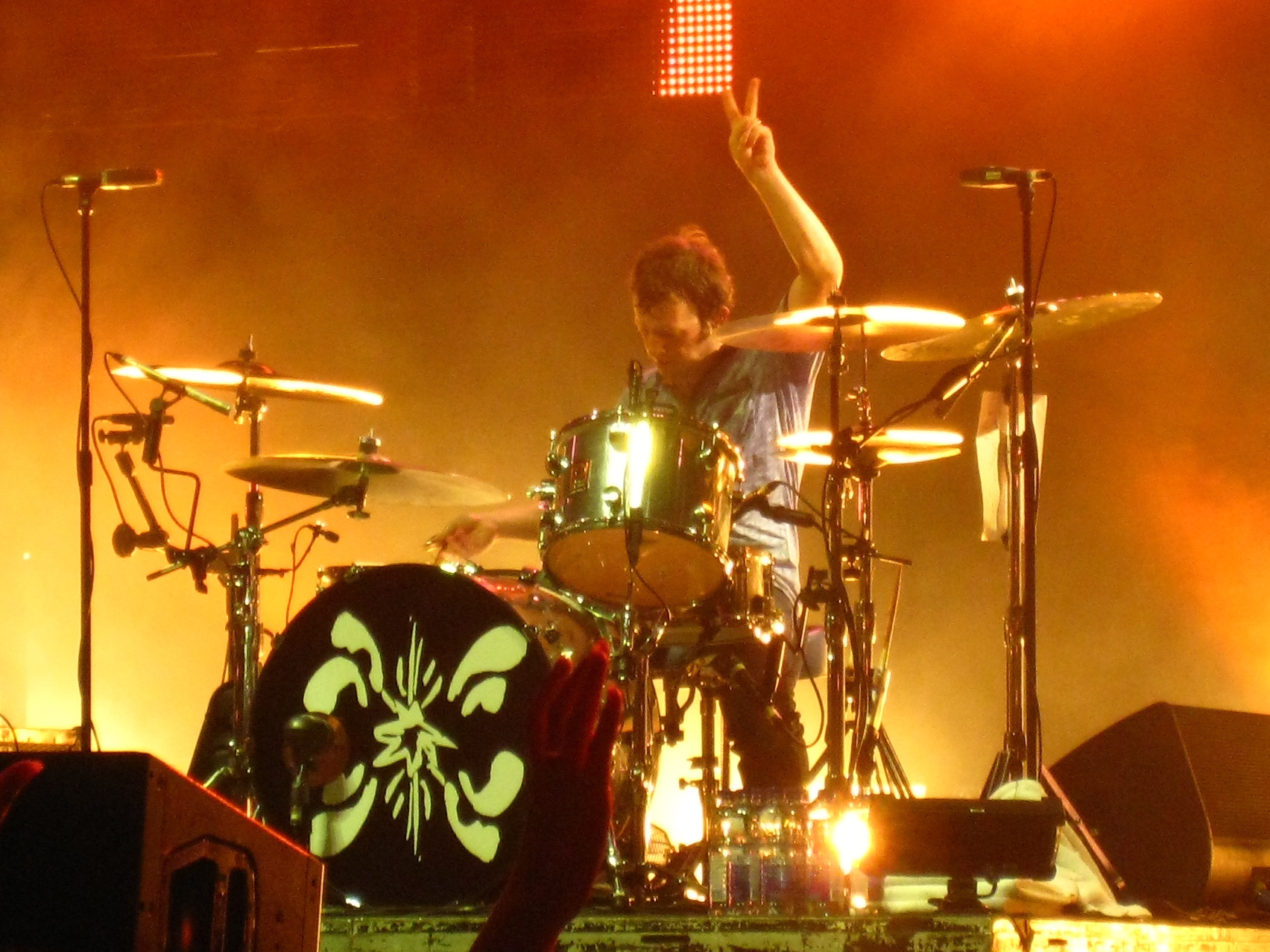
Chris Sharrock (pictured performing with Oasis in 2008) served as drummer from 1992 to 1997.

Released on 24 April 1990, Goodbye Jumbo was voted "album of the year" by Q magazine and was nominated for a Grammy Award for "best alternative music performance" in the US. The album contained the minor UK hit singles "Way Down Now" and "Put the Message in the Box" (the latter going on to be covered by Brian Kennedy on his 1996 album A Better Man, and becoming a top 40 hit in the UK and a top 20 hit in Ireland). After the 1991 EP Thank You World, World Party recruited former Bootleg Beatles member David Catlin-Birch as guitarist and ex-Icicle Works member Chris Sharrock on drums, with intentions to play more live dates. Instead, Ensign label boss Nigel Grainge cancelled a planned tour support slot with Neil Young in favour of further recording.

Looking back on the events 22 years later, Wallinger reflected "nowadays you would tour the fuck out of the Q Award thing, but (Grainge) was like, "No, you can’t go and support Neil Young in America – get back in the studio," and for me that meant three more years out of sight." He would consider this to be the decisive moment in the band's career which damaged its long-term chances. ("That was it. There was a moment there: door open, door closes.")

With touring plans shelved, World Party began work on a third album, Bang!. During the lengthy recording process, Chambers set up his own band The Lemon Trees in 1992, continuing with them in parallel to his World Party work until 1995.

Released in 1993, Bang! reached No. 2 on the UK Albums Chart, A single, "Is It Like Today?" (described by Wallinger as "a précis of Bertrand Russell's A History of Western Philosophy in four verses"), reached No. 19 on the UK Singles Chart as well as becoming a moderately successful single in Europe. Following the success of Bang!, World Party appeared at the Glastonbury Festival in 1994, at which they had previously played in 1987 and 1990. The album generated two further singles, "'Give It All Away" and "All I Gave".

In 1994, World Party recorded "When You Come Back to Me" for the Reality Bites soundtrack, influenced by David Bowie's 1975 song "Young Americans".

=== Egyptology (and "She's the One"), Dumbing Up, Wallinger's aneurysm and hiatus ===
Written following the death of Wallinger's mother, World Party's fourth album, Egyptology, was released in 1997. A single, "Beautiful Dream", only reached No. 31 in the British charts; and the album itself was commercially unsuccessful. Wallinger severed ties with his record label, regained his back catalogue in 1998, and began a three-year break.

Wallinger's discouragement with being shuffled from label to label (Ensign to Charisma to EMI) due to corporate takeovers had a lot to do with the break and his desire for practical independence. In 2012, he explained "basically my last fax or whatever it was to EMI was literally just like "fuck off"... At that point I just said "tell them we don’t want any more money, just say give me back the catalogue and I'll walk and we'll call it a day". Just to demonstrate how little it mattered to them, they said yes. It ended up on the front cover of Music Week... It was great to get my music back because otherwise they can do anything with it, they can just put it on a shelf, anything. Getting control of that back was the essence of being able to survive really, because since then I've had tracks in films and in television programmes and the money's come to me instead of a black hole as it was with EMI. And also when you're doing your own thing, it's much nicer because you can surround yourself with people you want to be surrounded with."

Meanwhile, in January 1997, Chambers had departed the band in order to accept the role of musical director for Robbie Williams. This, in turn, led to Williams re-recording an Egyptology track, "She's the One" (which had won Wallinger an Ivor Novello Award in 1997), and releasing it as a single in November 1999. The Williams version reached No. 1 in the UK charts. Chris Sharrock, plus World Party's touring bassist of the time, performed on the new version, which was very similar to the World Party original apart from the addition of string orchestra parts. Wallinger was not informed about either the recording of the cover version or the involvement of members of his own band, later commenting "it was very strange. Nobody phoned me to say they were doing it, and they used the band I’d just been on the road with to record it. It also annoyed me that Robbie didn’t sing the right words. It was a weird one: you lose your friends but you make loads of money."

Wallinger was further annoyed when Sharrock subsequently quit World Party to join Chambers in Williams' live band. He would later admit to having experienced "ongoing bitterness" and that "the song had a much better time than me, popping off to the Brits while I was at home eating crackers dipped in water". In 2012, he recalled "at the time it seemed horribly clandestine and then Robbie stole my band and I was like, "What are you doing, guys?"..."

With Catlin-Birch still on board, Wallinger released a fifth World Party album, Dumbing Up, in 2000 (which peaked at No. 64 on the UK Albums Chart). A lone single, "Here Comes the Future", was released the same year, pointedly featuring the original version of "She's the One" as a B-side.

Plans were made for touring in spring 2001, only to be cut short by Wallinger sufferering a brain aneurysm in February 2001 while cycling with his son on a Center Parcs holiday in Suffolk. He was left with damaged eyesight plus a prolonged (if temporary) inability to speak, play instruments or carry out any other musical activities.

All World Party activity was put on hold for five years while Wallinger recuperated and painstakingly learned how to play music again. During this time, he was sustained by royalties from the Williams cover of "She's the One". In 2012, he admitted "thank God they did record it. It kept me and the family in spaghetti when I was ill and couldn’t work."

=== Later period and final years ===
In 2006 Wallinger re-emerged onto the scene. With his back catalogue reclaimed from EMI, a distribution deal was agreed (via his own Seaview label) with Universal, and he played his first live show in a decade at the South by Southwest festival in Texas, US. He played additional US dates in 2006 including the Bonnaroo Festival in Tennessee. Big Blue Ball, a joint project with Peter Gabriel with production work by Stephen Hague was also released.

Subsequent World Party activity was intermittent. In September 2007, World Party supported Steely Dan in their first tour of Australia. The Best in Show compilation was released to celebrate the Australian tour. In 2009, World Party toured the west coast of the US, and appeared at Seattle's Bumbershoot Festival and San Francisco's Hardly Strictly Bluegrass Festival.

In 2012, World Party released a new five-CD/70-song collection of new songs, live recordings and cover versions titled Arkeology to critical acclaim. The band toured extensively in America in 2012, and toured England for the first time in 12 years, ending with an appearance in November 2012 in London at the Royal Albert Hall. Live dates and tours followed through 2015, and a 2013 UK show was issued as a 2-CD set called World Party – Live!.

Following the end of their 2015 North American tour World Party no longer toured, released new material, or updated their website. Wallinger moved to Hastings and continued working on music while keeping a low profile. An interview with Mojo in 2021 revealed that Wallinger still hoped that "a 63-year-old Welshman can say something relevant, post-apocalypse. Who knows how close it is to a parting shot?" but also warned "it's useless to try to find out what I'm up to... (I'm) just a guy who makes noises in a room and plays them to as few people as possible."

In 2021 the World Party vinyl reissue campaign started with Egyptology receiving an expanded edition in 2022.

In late 2022 interview with The Big Takeover Wallinger claimed to be close to finishing a new album, aiming to release it in early 2023. He claimed "I’ve got twenty-odd years of material... What I’m trying to do is make everything the most contemporary version of things, rather than go back and just say, "How can I finish these songs off and put them out?" I want everything to be from around now, so that's what I'm heading toward... I'm really looking forward to it. It'll be just like rolling the stone away from the front of the cave and coming out again into the sunlight. I'll be so happy to have an album out."

Karl Wallinger died on 10 March 2024 at the age of 66.

An expanded edition of World Party best of compilation Best in Show was released in 2025.

== Members ==
- Karl Wallinger – vocals, guitar, keyboards, bass, drums, programming (1986–2015; died 2024)
- Guy Chambers – keyboards, backing vocals (1987–1993, 1997)
- David Catlin-Birch – guitar, bass, backing vocals (1990–1997, 2012)
- Chris Sharrock – drums, percussion (1990–1997, 2000)

=== Additional members ===
- Anthony Thistlethwaite – saxophone (1986, 1997; studio)
- Mike Scott – guitar, backing vocals (1986; studio)
- Dominic Miller – guitar (1987, 1993)
- Martyn Swain – keyboards (1987)
- Lennox Meade – bass (1987)
- Dave Ruffy – drums (1987)
- Chris Whitten – drums (1990, 2006)
- Jeff Trott – guitar (1990)
- Max Edie – backing vocals, keyboards, percussion (1990)
- Steve McEwan – guitar, backing vocals (1993)
- John Turnbull – guitar, backing vocals (1993–2008, 2014–2015)
- Amanda Kramer – keyboards (1997, 2006)
- Dave Duffy – violin, mandolin backing vocals (2006–2015)
- John Duffy – keyboards, accordion, guitar (2006)
- Nathan Fisher – bass (2006–2008)
- Will Foster – keyboards (2007)

== Music ==
Wallinger cited influences such as the Beatles, Bob Dylan, the Beach Boys, Junior Walker, Neil Young and Prince. He sang and played most of the instruments himself, using multi-tracking to create the studio sound. Lyrically, many of his songs featured thoughtful and occasionally political sentiments.

== Discography ==
=== Studio albums ===
Year	Album	Peak positions									Certifications (sales threshold)
Year	Album	UK	AUS	CAN	GER	NED	NZ	NOR	SWE	US	Certifications (sales threshold)
1986	Private Revolution	56	13	60	—	—	18	—	—	39	
1990	Goodbye Jumbo	36	70	26	—	38	—	—	20	73	BPI: Silver
1993	Bang!	2	40	49	69	55	—	9	29	126	BPI: Gold
1997	Egyptology	34	—	—	—	—	—	—	22	167	
2000	Dumbing Up	64	—	—	—	—	—	—	—	—	
"—" denotes releases that did not chart or were not released.

=== Live albums ===
Year	Album	Comment
2014	World Party Live!	Recorded live at the Picturedrome, Holmfirth, UK, April 2013

=== Compilation albums ===
Year	Album	Comment
2007	Best in Show	Greatest hits compilation
2022	Seaview Records Presents: World Party	The Best of World Party limited compilation

=== Box sets ===
Year	Album	Comment
2012	Arkeology	5-CD/70 song set of new songs, demos, outtakes, B-sides, alternate mixes, live tracks and radio sessions

=== Singles ===
Year	Single	Peak positions									Album
Year	Single	UK	AUS	CAN	GER	NED	NZ	US Hot 100	US Alt.	US MSR	Album
1986	"Private Revolution"	107	—	—	—	—	—	—	—	—	Private Revolution
1987	"Ship of Fools"	42	4	42	—	65	21	27	—	5	Private Revolution
1987	"All Come True"	—	—	—	—	—	—	—	—	—	Private Revolution
1990	"Put the Message in the Box"	39	86	—	—	—	—	—	8	33	Goodbye Jumbo
1990	"Way Down Now"	66	114	53	—	17	—	—	1	21	Goodbye Jumbo
1991	"Thank You World"	68	—	—	—	—	—	—	—	—	Goodbye Jumbo
1993	"Is It Like Today?"	19	62	24	52	—	—	—	5	38	Bang!
1993	"Give It All Away"	43	—	—	—	—	—	—	—	—	Bang!
1993	"All I Gave"	37	—	—	—	—	—	—	—	—	Bang!
1997	"Beautiful Dream"	31	—	—	—	—	—	—	—	—	Egyptology
1997	"She's the One" (promotional only)	—	—	—	—	—	—	—	—	—	Egyptology
1997	"Call Me Up" (promotional only)	—	—	—	—	—	—	—	—	—	Egyptology
2000	"Here Comes the Future"	89	—	—	—	—	—	—	—	—	Dumbing Up
2006	"Best Place I've Ever Been"	—	—	—	—	—	—	—	—	—	Dumbing Up
2012	"Words!" (promotional only)	—	—	—	—	—	—	—	—	—	Arkeology
"—" denotes releases that did not chart or were not released.

=== Other appearances ===
List of guest appearances, showing year released and album name
Title	Year	Album
"World Without Love"	1992	Ruby Trax: The NME's Roaring Forty
"When You Come Back to Me"	1995	Reality Bites: Music from the Motion Picture
"Martha My Dear"	1997	Come Again
"She's the One"	2005	Acoustic 05
