= Strictly The Best vol. 46 =

Compilation album by Various artists
- Released: December 4, 2012
- Genre: Reggae, lovers rock
- Label: VP

Strictly The Best vol. 46 is a compilation album released by VP Records. It is released on December 4, 2012, along with Strictly The Best vol. 47. Strictly The Best (STB), is one of the longest compilation series in reggae music and in the music business. The series was launched in 1991. Every Year, VP Records releases two STB series, one for reggae and another one for dancehall, a series highlighting the biggest hits and artists in reggae & dancehall of the year from new artists to top stars. In contrast with a dancehall compilation album STB vol. 47, STB vol. 46 features lovers rock and conscious reggae tunes that bring listeners to the soft side of reggae. STB vol. 46 is a double-disc album: disc one includes latest reggae hits from Beres Hammond, Freddie McGregor, Morgan Heritage, Romain Virgo, Christopher Martin, Gyptian, Busy Signal, Tarrus Riley, Etana, Jah Cure, Chino, Iba Mahr, and Jamelody. Disc two is a set of classic reggae hits that represent the values and consistency of the series. featuring artists from disc two are: Sanchez, Anthony B, V.C., Jah Mason, Jr. Kelly, George Nooks, Gyptian, Etana, Bascom X, Busy Signal, Terry Linen, Mr. Vegas. The CD cover was designed and created by Clovis Brown.

== Executive producers ==
Chris Chin

== Track listing ==
=== Disc 1 ===
No.	Title	Writer(s)	Producer(s)	Length
1.	"The Return / Morgan Heritage"	M.Heritage / S.Browm / K.Bennett / A.Hoilett / K.Webster	Shane C. Brown
2.	"Sound Alarm / Iba Mahr"	R.McDermott / J. Edward / M.Greaves / D.White/ S.Stone / L.Brown / M.Chin	Roland McDermott / Jermaine Edward
3.	"Reggae Music Again / Busy Signal"	R.Gordon / D.Germain / K.Bennett / A.Hoilett / L.Savory	Donovan Germain / Shane C. Brown
4.	"Dancing Beauty / Beres Hammond"	H.Hammond / D.Germain / K.Bennett/ A.Hoilett / L.Savory	Beres Hammond / Donovan Germain
5.	"Lover's Leap / Tarrus Riley"	O.Riley / B.Lee	Dean Fraser
6.	"If I Were... / Christopher Martin"	T.Hardin	Robert Livingston
7.	"One More Night / Gyptian"	W.Edwards / L.White / I.Holmes / E.Jensen	Linton "TJ" White
8.	"Start Over / Etana"	S.McKenzie / K.Bennett / S.Brown / K.Mattis / L.Savory / A.Hoilett / K.Webster	Shane C.Brown
9.	"Fired Up Inside / Romain Virgo"	R.Virgo / S.Brown / L.Perry / J.Byles	Shane C.Brown
10.	"By My Side / Chino"	D.McGregor / S.McGregor	Stephen "Di Genius" McGregor
11.	"Cant Take My Eyes Off You / Jamelody"	M.Williams / B.Dixon	Bobby Dixon
12.	"That Girl / Jah Cure"	S.Alcock / C.Hunt / J.Boyd	Siccaturie Alcock
13.	"Africa / Freddie McGregor"	F.Simpson / L.Ferguson / D.Shaw / J.Hoo-Kim	C & R McLeod

=== Disc 2 ===
No.	Title	Writer(s)	Producer(s)	Length
1.	"God Is Standing By / George Nooks"	J.Taylor	George Nooks & Paul Henton
2.	"Never Dis The Man / Sanchez"	K.Jackson / P.Burrell	Phillip "Fattis" Burrell
3.	"Raid The Barn / Anthony B"	R.Bell	Richard Bell
4.	"By His Deeds / VC"	V.Craigie / M.Lewis / J.Lee	Digital Noize Productions
5.	"Prince Gone / Jah Mason"	R.McDermott / A.Johnson	R.McDermott
6.	"If Love So Nice / Junior Kelly"	K.Morgan / R.N.Marley	M.Stanford
7.	"Beautiful Lady / Gyptian"	W.Edwards / R.Stephens / A.Samad	Ray Stephens / Ricky Genious
8.	"Warrior Love / Etana"	McKenzie / S.Lewis / M.Solomon / K.Bennett / L.Savory / D.Fraser	Dean Fraser
9.	"Lonely Girl / Bascom X"	R.Sudlow / S.Gibson / N.Listrani	S.Gibbs / E.Thompson
10.	"One More Night / Busy Signal"	Phil Collins	Clayton / Carlington Morrison
11.	"Your Love Is My Love / Terry Linen"	W.Jean / J.Duplessis	Anthony Red Roze Cameron
12.	"Mus Come A Road / Mr. Vegas"	S.Hayden / C.Smith / B.Levy / H.Lawes	Stanley Aden
