= Ship of Fools (World Party song) =

Single by World Party

from the album Private Revolution
- B-side: "World Groove (Do the Mind Guerrilla)"
- Released: 25 November 1986
- Genre: Rock
- Length: 4:27
- Label: Chrysalis
- Songwriter: Karl Wallinger
- Producer: Karl Wallinger

World Party singles chronology
"Private Revolution" (1986)	"Ship of Fools" (1986)	"Put the Message in the Box" (1990)

Music video
- "Ship of Fools" on YouTube

"Ship of Fools" (subtitled "Save Me from Tomorrow") is a rock song by World Party, which was released as the second single from their 1986 debut album, Private Revolution. It was written and produced by singer and multi-instrumentalist Karl Wallinger, formerly of The Waterboys. Wallinger was the sole member of World Party at the time of release.

== Release and promotion ==
The single featured two non-album b-sides: "World Groove (Do The Mind Guerrilla)" and a cover of "Nowhere Man" by the Beatles. The latter was included on the 12" single that also featured a longer version of "Ship Of Fools".

The music video heavily features environmental themes, with Wallinger and a group of musicians superimposed over images depicting environmental issues.

Owing to its environmentalist lyrics and content, the song has also been included on over a dozen compilations, including Greenpeace's Rainbow Warriors compilation.

World Party performed "Ship Of Fools" on one of the last editions of "Whistle Test", recorded at BBC Cymru Wales's Studio C1, in Llandaf, Cardiff. They were a last minute replacement for The Smiths, who pulled out following the death of Morrissey’s grandmother.

In 2018 a new video for the song was released.

== Reception ==
"Ship Of Fools" was World Party's sole Billboard Top 40 single, debuting on that chart on 4 April 1987 and peaking at number 27. It also reached no. 42 on the UK singles chart, no. 5 on the Billboard Mainstream Rock chart, and no. 4 on the Australian Music Report chart.

== Track listings ==
All songs by Karl Wallinger except where noted

7-inch single

1. "Ship of Fools" – 4:13
2. "World Groove (Do You Mind Guerrilla)" – 2:48

12-inch single

1. "Ship of Fools" – 6:37
2. "World Groove (Do You Mind Guerrilla)" – 2:48
3. "Nowhere Man" (John Lennon, Paul McCartney) – 2:45

== Charts ==
=== Weekly charts ===
Chart (1987)	Peak position
Australia (Kent Music Report)	4
Canada Top Singles (RPM)	42
Netherlands (Single Top 100)	65
New Zealand (Recorded Music NZ)	21
UK Singles (Official Charts)	42
U.S. Billboard Hot 100	27
U.S. Billboard Hot Mainstream Rock Tracks	5

=== Year-end charts ===
Chart (1987)	Position
Australia (Australian Music Report)	39

== Cover versions ==
Australian indie pop/rock band Something for Kate released an acoustic cover version of the song on their Live at the Corner album in 2008.

A 2017 episode of the third season of the American black comedy-crime drama anthology series Fargo features a minimalist cover of "Ship of Fools" performed by series creator/show runner Noah Hawley (who provides vocals) and series composer Jeff Russo, exclusively for the show. The song appears at the end of the season's fifth episode, "The House of Special Purpose", and can also be found on the third season's soundtrack album.

In 2021 alternative rock band Lazlo Bane released a music video for the song and later included it on their 2021 album Someday We'll Be Together.
