= Dumbing Up =

2000 studio album by World Party

Studio album by World Party
- Released: 30 October 2000
- Genre: Rock
- Label: Papillon; Seaview
- Producer: Karl Wallinger

World Party chronology
Egyptology (1997)	Dumbing Up (2000)	Best in Show (2007)

Singles from Dumbing Up
- 1. "Here Comes the Future" Released: 2000; 2. "Best Place I've Ever Been" Released: 12 September 2006

Professional ratings
Review scores
Source	Rating
AllMusic	4/5 stars
The Encyclopedia of Popular Music	3/5 stars

Dumbing Up is the fifth and final studio album by World Party, released in 2000 on Karl Wallinger's own record label.

== Release and promotion ==
The album was supported by the single "Here Comes the Future" which included non-album b-side "Nothing Lasts Forever".

The album was re-released in 2006 with new track listing and bonus DVD with the music videos. In addition to changing the song sequence, the 2006 release of Dumbing Up drops the tracks "All the Love That's Wasted" and "Little Bit of Perfection", and replaces them with "'Til I Got You" and "I Thought You Were a Spy".

The re-release was supported with a new single "Best Place I've Ever Been" with non-album live tracks as b-sides.

== Reception ==
The album peaked at No. 64 on the UK Albums Chart.

NPR wrote that "with great melodies and astute lyrics, Dumbing Up is cause for celebration." The Guardian wrote that the songs, while tuneful, "display a dogged determination to ignore the last 30 years of pop." The Washington Post thought that "once again [Wallinger] revels in Have a Nice Day-era sounds."

== Track listing ==
=== 2000 release ===
All songs written by Karl Wallinger, except "Here Comes the Future" written by Wallinger, Somerset, Gorman & Burnett.

1. "Here Comes the Future" – 4:44
2. "What Does It Mean Now?" – 4:59
3. "Another 1000 Years" – 5:29
4. "High Love" – 6:51
5. "Best Place I've Ever Been" – 3:31
6. "You're a Hurricane, I'm a Caravan" – 4:00
7. "Who are You?" – 5:08
8. "See the Light" – 5:19
9. "Santa Barbara" – 4:17
10. "All the Love that's Wasted" – 4:33
11. "Little Bit of Perfection" – 5:26
12. "Always on My Mind" – 8:34

=== 2006 release ===
1. "Another 1000 Years" – 5:30
2. "What Does It Mean Now?" – 4:59
3. "'Til I Got You" – 3:42
4. "Who Are You?" – 5:06
5. "Here Comes the Future" – 4:44
6. "I Thought You Were a Spy" – 3:32
7. "High Love" – 6:50
8. "Best Place I've Ever Been" – 3:26
9. "Santa Barbara" – 4:23
10. "You're a Hurricane, I'm a Caravan" – 4:02
11. "See the Light" – 5:19
12. "Always on My Mind" – 8:34
