= Strictly The Best vol. 47 =

Studio album by Various artists
- Released: December 4, 2012
- Genre: Reggae, Dancehall
- Label: VP Records

Strictly the Best vol. 47 is a compilation dancehall album from VP Records. It is released on December 4, 2012, along with Strictly The Best vol. 46. Strictly The Best (STB) is one of the longest compilation series in reggae music and the music business. The series was launched in 1991. Every Year, VP Records releases two STB series, one for Reggae and another one for Dancehall, a series highlighting the biggest hits and the artists in reggae & dancehall of the year from new artists to top stars. In contrast with a reggae compilation album STB vol. 46, STB vol. 47 features dancehall and hard-core party tunes. Also like STB vol. 46, STB vol. 47 is a double disc CD. Disc one includes current hits from Popcaan, I-Octane, Mr. Vegas, RDX, Konshens, Vybz Kartel, Cherine Anderson with DI, Sean Paul with Kelly Rowland, Tommy Lee Sparta, Aidonia, and Bounty Killer. Disc two is a set of classic dancehall hits that are still favored in current dance scene. Featured artists from disc two are: Ini Kamoze, Nardo Ranks, Gregory Peck, Red Fox & Naturalee, Beenie Man, Tony Curtis, Tanya Stephens, Captain Barkey, Fabby Dolly, Ding Dong, Bounty Killer, Capleton. The CD cover was designed and created by Clovis Brown.

== Executive producers ==
- Chris Chin

== Track listing ==
=== Disc 1 ===
No.	Title	Writer(s)	Producer(s)	Length
1.	"Summer Wave (When We Party) / Popcaan"	A.Sutherland / A.Nilsson / L.White	Linton "TJ" White
2.	"We Love Di Vibes / I-Octane"	B.Muir / E.Redwood	Elvis Redwood
3.	"Bruk It Down / Mr.Vegas"	C.Smith / V.Edmund	Clifford Smith
4.	"Jump / RDX"	C.Williams / A.Bedward / H.Barclay	Carlton Williams / Andre Bedward
5.	"Stop Sign / Konshens"	M.Collinder / G.Spence	Mark Collinder / Garfield Spence
6.	"Get Gal Easy /Vybz Kartel"	A.Palmer / B.Konders / R.Johnson	Bobby Konders
7.	"Rebel / Danielle "D" feat. Cherine"	P.Wright / W.Passley / D.Isaacs / O.Baker / L.Dumbar / R.Shakespeare / P.Gayle / C.Anderson / S.Marsden / K.Lawrence	Sly Dumbar / Robbie Shakespeare
8.	"How Deep Is Your Love / Sean Paul feat. Kelly Rowland"	S.Henriques / J.Henriques / E.Dean / M.S.Eriksen / T.E.Hermansen / A.Malik / D.Omelio	Stargate
9.	"Some Bwoy / Tommy Lee Sparta"	L.Russel / J.Roberts / J.Forte	Jamie Roberts
10.	"La La Land / Aidonia"	S.Lawrence / F.Wright	Frederick Wright
11.	"Psycho / Tommy Lee Sparta"	L.Russel / A.Myrie	Andrew "Anjublax" Myrie
12.	"No Long Talking / Bounty Killer"	R.Fuller / R.Bailey / R.Price	Rohan "Jah Snowcone" Fuller
13.	"Uncle Demon / Tommy Lee Sparta"	L.Russel / A.Myrie / R.Graham	Andrew "Anjublax" Myrie / Robert "Dinearo" Graham

=== Disc 2 ===
No.	Title	Writer(s)	Producer(s)	Length
1.	"Hot Stepper / Ini Kamoze"	I.Kamoze	Phillip "Fattis" Burrel
2.	"Them A Bleach / Nardo Ranks"	L.Willis / G.Henderson / L.Dunbar	Sly Dundar / Robbie Shakespeare / Lloyd Willis
3.	"Poco Man Jam / Gregory Peck"	W.JOHNSON / C.BROWNE / G.WILLIAMS	Steely & Clevie
4.	"Down In Jamaica / Red Fox & Naturalee"	D.Shelton / P.McKenzie	Peter McKenzie / Phillip Smart
5.	"BlackBoard / Beenie Man"	M.Davis / L.Dunbar / P.Yebuah	Aiden Jones
6.	"Faith / Tony Curtis"	Michael George	Richard Martin
7.	"Goggle / Tanya Stephens"	S.Marsden / V.Stephenson / A.Kelly	Tony Kelly / Patrick Roberts
8.	"Go Go Wine / Captain Barkey"	J.Hamilton / O.Reynolds	Stone Love
9.	"Peanut Punch / Fabby Dolly"	A.Cameron / C.Harrison / H.Browne / L.Dunbar	Anthony Cameron / Anthony Malvo
10.	"Badman Forward / Ding Dong"	K.Ottey / R.Johnson / D.Pairt	Rohan Gray
11.	"Sufferah / Bounty Killer"	R.Price / S.Marsden / M.Harris	Stephen Marsden
12.	"BadMind / Capleton"	C.Bailey / O.Baker / L.Dunbar	Sly & Robbie
