= Bang! (World Party album) =

1993 studio album by World Party

Studio album by World Party
- Released: April 20, 1993 (US); April 25, 1993 (UK)
- Studio: Seaview Studios (London)
- Genre: Rock
- Length: 52:22
- Label: Ensign
- Producer: Karl Wallinger

World Party chronology
Goodbye Jumbo (1990)	Bang! (1990)	Egyptology (1997)

Singles from Bang!
- 1. "Is It Like Today?" Released: March 29, 1993; 2. "Give It All Away" Released: June 28, 1993; 3. "All I Gave" Released: September 20, 1993

2001 reissue cover

Professional ratings
Review scores
Source	Rating
AllMusic	3/5 stars
Chicago Tribune	2/4 stars
Los Angeles Times	3.5/4 stars
NME	6/10
Q	5/5 stars
Rolling Stone	3/5 stars

Bang! is the third studio album by Welsh-British group World Party, released by Ensign Records on April 20, 1993.

== Overview ==
While previous World Party albums were essentially solo projects by multi-instrumentalist Karl Wallinger, for this album World Party officially became a three-person group: Wallinger (vocals, keyboards, guitars, basses, etc.), David Catlin-Birch (guitars), and Chris Sharrock (drums). As well, the band is aided by a number of guest artists.

== Release ==
In 2001, the album was re-released by Papillon Records with new cover art. Since 2001 the reissues combined the 12th track "Give It All Away (Reprise)" into the fifth track "Give It All Away" to create an extended version of the song. The reissues also omit the hidden track "Kuwait City".

== Track listing ==
All tracks are written by Karl Wallinger, with additional writers noted.

No.	Title	Writer(s)	Length
1.	"Kingdom Come"		5:27
2.	"Is It Like Today?"		5:11
3.	"What Is Love All About?"		4:06
4.	"And God Said..."	Guy Chambers	0:26
5.	"Give It All Away"		4:23
6.	"Sooner or Later"		4:34
7.	"Hollywood"		4:09
8.	"Radio Days"	Chambers, David Caitlin-Birch	4:53
9.	"Rescue Me"		6:06
10.	"Sunshine"		4:31
11.	"All I Gave"		3:47
12.	"Give It All Away (Reprise)"		4:48
13.	"Kuwait City" (Hidden track after 21:36 of silence)		3:11
Total length:			55:32

Bonus Tracks (Japan)
No.	Title	Writer(s)	Length
1.	"Basically"		4:48
2.	"Closer Still"		1:07
3.	"World Without Love" (From the compilation album "Ruby Trax – The NME's Roaring Forty")	Lennon–McCartney	3:11
Total length:			64:38

== Personnel ==
=== Band ===
- Karl Wallinger – lead vocals, guitar, bass, piano, keyboards, programming
- David Caitlin-Birch – vocals, guitar, piano
- Chris Sharrock – drums

=== Additional musicians ===
- Guy Chambers – keyboards
- Dominic Miller – guitar
- Karen Ramelise – vocals

== Production ==
- Produced by Karl Wallinger (all tracks) and Steve Lillywhite (tracks 2, 3, 7, 8, 10)
- Recorded by Karl Wallinger (all tracks) and Joe Blaney (tracks 8, 10, 11)
- Mixed by Karl Wallinger (tracks 1, 4, 5, 6, 9, 11, 12) and Steve Lillywhite (tracks 2, 3, 7, 8, 10).
- Mastered and edited by Tim Young
- Art direction and design – Michael Nash
- Design assistant and makeup – Suzie Zamit
- Cover photography – Steve Wallace
- Photography assistant – Judy Price and Karl Wallinger

== Charts ==
Weekly chart performance for Bang!
Chart (1993)	Peak position
Australian Albums (ARIA)	40
Canadian Albums Chart	49
Dutch Albums (Album Top 100)	55
German Albums (Offizielle Top 100)	69
Norwegian Albums (VG-lista)	9
Swedish Albums (Sverigetopplistan)	29
UK Albums Chart	2
US Billboard 200	126

== Certifications ==
Region	Certification	Certified units/sales
United Kingdom (BPI)	Gold	100,000^{^}
^{^} Shipments figures based on certification alone.
