= Reggae Gold 1998 =

Compilation album by Various artists
- Released: 1998
- Genre: Reggae

Various artists chronology
Reggae Gold 1997 (1997)	Reggae Gold 1998 (1998)	Reggae Gold 1999 (1999)

Reggae Gold 1998 is a compilation album of reggae artists released in 1998. The album spent 82 weeks on Billboard's Reggae Album chart after debuting at #1. Reggae Gold also spent 8 weeks on the Billboard 200.

== Track listing ==
1. "She Nuh Ready Yet" - Spragga Benz
2. "Gal Pon de Side" - Frisco Kid
3. "Tell Me" - Beenie Man
4. "Infiltrate" - Sean Paul
5. "Cry for Die For" - Bounty Killer
6. "Heads High" - Mr. Vegas
7. "Babylon Ah Listen" - Sizzla
8. "Destiny" - Buju Banton
9. "Sweep over My Soul" - Luciano
10. "Boom Boom" - Degree
11. "We Nuh Like" - Spragga Benz
12. "Tight up Skirt" - Red Rat
13. "Bad Man Nuh Dress Like Girl" - Harry Toddler
14. "Hold On" - Beres Hammond
15. "Going Away" - Beenie Man, Sanchez
16. "Don't Follow Rumours" - Carlton Livingston, Shabba Ranks
