= Trojan Box Set series =

Compilation album series

The Trojan Box Set series is a range of various artist triple CD box sets, periodically released by the British reggae record label Trojan Records since 1998. The series covers a wide variety of reggae subgenres, styles and themes.

Each set has standard formatting. The title is Trojan Box Set (except RAS and Creole Reggae) The artwork is usually a colourful, distinctive variation on a generic design, with the Trojan Records logo as the central motif (except Upsetter, RAS, Creole Reggae and Reggae For Kids). There are usually 50 songs in each set (except 12" with 35). The packaging is a clamshell cardboard box with an individual hard paper slipcase for each disc, plus basic track information and/or liner notes. Despite being billed as "limited edition", many sets have remained widely available. In addition to the 69 box sets released by the label, three additional box sets were released in limited Japan-only markets in 2005-2007 and are not widely available in other markets: Trojan Katsuo Box (2005), Trojan HMV Box Set (2006), and Trojan Tower Box Set (2007). The Japan releases include more songs per set than the other 69 releases: Trojan Katsuo Box features 70 songs, Trojan HMV Box Set features 51 songs, and Trojan Tower Box Set features 54 songs. Like the other 69 releases, the Japanese box sets include three slipcases with tracklists, but rather than essays or liner notes, include original drawings and artwork. The cover art for these box sets also differs from the others in format and style.

== Titles in the Trojan Box Set series ==
1998

- Trojan Ska Box Set (TRBCD001)
- Trojan Dub Box Set (TRBCD002)
- Trojan Rocksteady Box Set (TRBCD003)
- Trojan D.J. Box Set (TRBCD004)

1999

- Trojan Lovers Box Set (TRBCD005)
- Trojan Tribute To Bob Marley Box Set (TRBCD006)
- Trojan Instrumentals Box Set (TRBCD007)
- Trojan Roots Box Set (TRBCD008)
- Trojan Jamaican Superstars Box Set (TRBCD009)
- Trojan Producer Series Box Set (TRBCD010)
- Trojan Rare Groove Box Set (TRBCD011)
- Trojan Singles Box Set (TRBCD012)

2000

- Trojan Ska Box Set Volume 2 (TRBCD014)
- Trojan Dub Box Set Volume 2 (TRBCD015)
- Trojan Jamaican Hits Box Set (TRBCD017)
- Trojan 'Tighten Up' Box Set (TRBCD018)
- Trojan Club Reggae Box Set (TRBCD020)
- Trojan Soulful Reggae Box Set (TRBCD021)
- Trojan Rastafari Box Set (TRBCD022)
- Trojan Dancehall Box Set (TRBCD023)

2002

- Trojan Skinhead Reggae Box Set (TJETD003)
- Trojan UK Hits Box Set (TJETD010)
- Trojan Mod Reggae Box Set (TJETD020)
- Trojan Upsetter Box Set (TJETD021)
- Trojan Bob Marley & Friends Box Set (TJETD028)
- Trojan Revive Box Set (TJETD029)
- Trojan Calypso Box Set (TJETD033)
- Trojan Jamaican R&B Box Set (TJETD042)
- Trojan X-Rated Box Set (TJETD048)
- Trojan Rude Boy Box Set (TJETD055)
- Trojan British Reggae Box Set (TJETD070)

2003

- Trojan Reggae Brothers Box Set (TJETD072)
- Trojan Reggae Sisters Box Set (TJETD073)
- Trojan 12" Box Set (TJETD084)
- Trojan Reggae Duets Box Set (TJETD093)
- Trojan Nyahbinghi Box Set (TJETD094)
- Trojan Originals Box Set (TJETD098)
- Trojan Ganja Reggae Box Set (TJETD102)
- Trojan Reggae Chill-out Box Set (TJETD115)
- Trojan 35th Anniversary Box Set (TJETD130)
- Trojan Carnival Box Set (TJETD132)
- Trojan Christmas Box Set (TJETD142)
- Trojan Ska Revival Box Set (TJETD146)
- RAS Reggae Box Set (TJETD152)

2004

- The Creole Reggae Box Set (TJETD161)
- Trojan Suedehead Box Set (TJETD169)
- Trojan Sixties Box Set (TJETD174)
- Trojan Sunshine Reggae Box Set (TJETD185)
- Trojan Seventies Box Set (TJETD192)
- Trojan Jamaica Box Set (TJETD199)
- Trojan Ragga Box Set (TJETD207)
- Trojan Reggae Rarities Box Set (TJETD215)
- Trojan Beatles Tribute Box Set (TJETD220)

2005

- Trojan Roots & Culture Box Set (TJETD226)
- Trojan Ska Rarities Box Set (TJETD238)
- Trojan Dancehall Roots Box Set (TJETD243)
- Trojan Eighties Box Set (TJETD253)
- Trojan Reggae For Kids Box Set (TJETD262)
- Trojan Legends Box Set (TJETD271)
- Trojan Dub Rarities Box Set (TJETD278)
- Trojan Mod Reggae Vol.2 Box Set (TJETD287)
- Trojan Lovers Rock Box Set (TJETD292)
- Trojan Roots Reggae Box Set (TJETD296)
- Trojan Rocksteady Rarities Box Set (TJETD299)
- Trojan Katsuo Box (TJETD9000)

2006

- Trojan Motor City Reggae Box Set (TJETD309)
- Trojan Bob Marley Covers Box Set (TJETD323)
- Trojan Rockers Box Set (TJETD338)
- Trojan HMV Box Set (TJETD9001)

2007

- Trojan Slack Reggae Box Set (TJETD348)
- Trojan Country Reggae Box Set (TJETD365)
- Trojan Tower Box Set (TJETD9002)
