= Arkology (album) =

Compilation album by Various artists
- Released: 1997
- Studio: Black Ark (Kingston, Jamaica)
- Genre: Reggae, dub
- Label: Universal / Island
- Producer: Lee "Scratch" Perry

Professional ratings
Review scores
Source	Rating
AllMusic	5/5 stars
Muzik	10/10
NME	8/10

Arkology is a compilation album by Lee "Scratch" Perry. Released in 1997, the album collects tracks produced by Perry and recorded at the Black Ark studio.

The album was listed in the 1999 book The Rough Guide: Reggae: 100 Essential CDs.

== Track listing ==
=== Reel I: Dub Organiser ===
1. Lee Perry & the Upsetters – "Dub Revolution Part 1" 4:44
2. Max Romeo – "One Step Forward" 3:52
3. The Upsetters – "One Step Dub" (Extended Mix) 4:06
4. Devon Irons – "Vampire" 3:17
5. The Upsetters – "Vamp a Dub" 3:16
6. The Heptones – "Sufferer's Time" 3:55
7. The Upsetters – "Sufferers Dub" (extended mix) 4:17
8. Junior Dread – "Sufferers Heights" (alternate mix) 4:32
9. The Congos – "Don't Blame on I" 4:05
10. The Meditations – "Much Smarter" 3:56
11. The Upsetters – "Much Smarter Dub" 4:42
12. The Meditations – "Life Is Not Easy" (alternate mix) 4:46
13. The Upsetters – "Life Is Not Easy Dub" (alternate mix) 5:07
14. Junior Murvin – "Tedious" (extended mix) 5:04
15. Max Romeo – "War in a Babylon" 4:51
16. The Upsetters – "Revelation Dub" 5:01
17. The Heptones & Jah Lion – "Mr. President" 4:13
18. Max Romeo – "Chase the Devil" 3:28

=== Reel II: Dub Shepherd ===
1. Lee Perry – "Dreadlocks in Moonlight" 3:46
2. Mikey Dread – "Dread at the Mantrols" 3:47
3. Errol Walker – "In These Times" 4:39
4. The Upsetters – "In These Times Dub" 3:24
5. Max Romeo – "Norman" (extended domino mix) 8:42
6. Junior Murvin – "Police and Thieves" 3:40
7. Glen DaCosta – "Magic Touch" 4:03
8. Jah Lion – "Soldier & Police War " 4:09
9. The Upsetters – "Grumblin' Dub" 3:18
10. Junior Murvin – "Bad Weed" 4:02
11. Errol Walker – "John Public" 4:21
12. Errol Walker & Enos Barnes – "John Public" (version) 4:23
13. Junior Murvin – "Roots Train" (extended mix) 8:59
14. The Meditations – "No Peace" 3:30
15. The Upsetters – "No Peace Dub" 4:20
16. Raphael Green – "Rasta Train" 4:54
17. The Upsetters – "Party Time Part 2" 4:34

=== Reel III: Dub Adventurer ===
1. Augustus Pablo – "Vibrate On" 4:40
2. The Upsetters – "Vibrator" 4:35
3. The Upsetters – "Bird in Hand" 3:30
4. The Congos – "Congoman" 5:52
5. The Upsetters – "Dyon Anasawa" (alternate mix) 3:39
6. The Upsetters – "Rastaman Shuffle" 5:16
7. The Heptones – "Why Must I" (version) 4:57
8. The Heptones – "Make Up Your Mind" 3:45
9. The Upsetter Review – "Closer Together" 6:15
10. Keith Rowe – "Groovy Situation" 3:26
11. The Upsetters – "Groovy Dub" 3:33
12. George Faith – "To Be a Lover (Have Some Mercy)" 7:56
13. Lee Perry – "Soul Fire" 3:58
14. Lee Perry – "Curly Locks" 4:09
15. The Congos – "Feast Of The Passover (extended mix)" 3:36
16. Lee Perry – "Roast Fish & Cornbred" (extended mix) 4:26
17. The Upsetters – "Corn Fish Dub" (extended mix) 4:26
