= David Catlin-Birch =

British musician

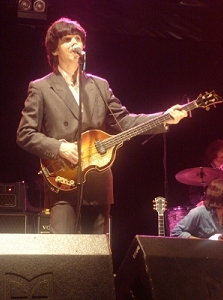
- Catlin-Birch performing as Paul McCartney in The Bootleg Beatles (2006)

Background information
- Genres: Pop, rock
- Occupation: Musician
- Instruments: Bass; guitar; piano; vocals
- Years active: 1980–present

David Catlin-Birch is a British musician. He was a guitarist for pop/alternative rock band World Party, and was the original "Paul" for the March 1980 launch of The Beatles tribute band, The Bootleg Beatles.

In the 1990s he collaborated with Karl Wallinger touring and recording the Bang! album. In the same period he formed the group The Lemon Trees with Guy Chambers.

With Rowland Rivron and Richard Vranch, he made up the core team for BBC Radio 2's musical comedy show Jammin which won a Silver Sony Comedy Award in 2004. He played bass guitar with The Flight of the Conchords on their 2005 Radio 2 series.

In 2006, he joined Neil Innes and the Bonzo Dog Doo-Dah Band for their UK tour as lead guitarist, taking lead vocals for a handful of songs and recording as a member of the band on its first album in 36 years, Pour l'Amour des Chiens.

As a session guitarist, bass guitarist, vocalist, drummer and keyboard player, he has performed with Eurythmics, Stevie Wonder, Ringo Starr, Joe Cocker and Robbie Williams. He also briefly wrote with the late Viv Stanshall from the Bonzo Dog Doo-Dah Band. In November 2002, he performed with Jim Lea, the former bass guitarist of Slade, at his one-off "Jim Jam" gig at the Robin 2 club in Wolverhampton when Lea played lead guitar. He left the Bootleg Beatles in 2012.
