= And Through It All: Robbie Williams Live 1997–2006 =

Video by Robbie Williams
- Released: 28 November 2006
- Recorded: 1997–2006
- Genre: Pop
- Length: 250:03
- Label: EMI

Robbie Williams chronology
What We Did Last Summer (2003)	And Through It All: Robbie Williams Live 1997–2006 (2006)	In and Out of Consciousness: Greatest Hits 1990–2010 (2010)

And Through It All: Robbie Williams Live 1997–2006 is a DVD that was released in November 2006 of various live performances recorded between 1997 and 2006.

== Track listing ==
Disc one
No.	Title	Length
1.	"Strong" (Live at Slane Castle in County Meath, Ireland, 1999)	5:01
2.	"She's the One" (Live at Slane Castle in County Meath, Ireland, 1999)	4:23
3.	"Ego a Go Go" (Live at Slane Castle in County Meath, Ireland, 1999)	4:14
4.	"No Regrets" (Live at Slane Castle in County Meath, Ireland, 1999)	5:39
5.	"Karma Killer" (Live at the Manchester Evening New Arena in Manchester, England, 2000)	4:32
6.	"Kids" (Live at the Manchester Evening New Arena in Manchester, England, 2000)	6:08
7.	"Millennium" (Live at the Manchester Evening New Arena in Manchester, England, 2000)	4:08
8.	"Rock DJ" (Live at the Manchester Evening New Arena in Manchester, England, 2000)	4:36
9.	"Let Me Entertain You" (Live at the Müngersdorfer Stadion in Cologne, Germany, 2001)	8:36
10.	"No Regrets" (Live at the Müngersdorfer Stadion in Cologne, Germany, 2001)	5:32
11.	"Supreme" (Live at the Müngersdorfer Stadion in Cologne, Germany, 2001)	4:48
12.	"Angels" (Live at the Müngersdorfer Stadion in Cologne, Germany, 2001)	4:33
13.	"Rock DJ" (Live at the Müngersdorfer Stadion in Cologne, Germany, 2001)	7:20
14.	"Come Undone" (Live at Knebworth Park in Stevenage, England, 2003)	5:03
15.	"Kids" (Live at Knebworth Park in Stevenage, England, 2003)	6:50
16.	"Feel" (Live at Knebworth Park in Stevenage, England, 2003)	6:13
17.	"Angels" (Live at Knebworth Park in Stevenage, England, 2003)	5:44
18.	"Radio" (Live at Roundhay Park in Leeds, England, 2006)	5:57
19.	"Tripping" (Live at Roundhay Park in Leeds, England, 2006)	4:59
20.	"Sin Sin Sin" (Live at Roundhay Park in Leeds, England, 2006)	4:20
21.	"Advertising Space" (Live at Roundhay Park in Leeds, England, 2006)	5:03
22.	"Let Me Entertain You" (Live at Roundhay Park in Leeds, England, 2006)	5:58
23.	"Rudebox" (Live at Roundhay Park in Leeds, England, 2006)	4:50
Total length:		124:45

Disc two
No.	Title	Length
1.	"Ego a Go Go" (Live at The Forum in London, England, 1998)	4:29
2.	"Teenage Millionaire" (Live at The Forum in London, England, 1998)	4:04
3.	"Clean" (Live at The Forum in London, England, 1998)	3:56
4.	"South of the Border" (Live at The Forum in London, England, 1998)	4:03
5.	"Old Before I Die" (Live at The Forum in London, England, 1998)	4:01
6.	"Angels" (Live at The Forum in London, England, 1998)	4:32
7.	"Come Undone" (Recorded at Abbey Road Studios in London, England, 2003)	5:05
8.	"Me and My Monkey" (Recorded at Abbey Road Studios in London, England, 2003)	7:15
9.	"No Regrets" (Recorded at Abbey Road Studios in London, England, 2003)	5:10
10.	"Feel" (Recorded at Abbey Road Studios in London, England, 2003)	4:34
11.	"Phoenix From the Flames" (Recorded at Abbey Road Studios in London, England, 2003)	4:17
12.	"Feel" (Live at the Velodrom in Berlin, Germany, 2005)	4:25
13.	"A Place to Crash" (Live at the Velodrom in Berlin, Germany, 2005)	4:41
14.	"Tripping" (Live at the Velodrom in Berlin, Germany, 2005)	4:56
15.	"Make Me Pure" (Live at the Velodrom in Berlin, Germany, 2005)	4:36
16.	"Sin Sin Sin" (Live at the Velodrom in Berlin, Germany, 2005)	4:19
17.	"No Regrets" (Live at the Velodrom in Berlin, Germany, 2005)	5:15
18.	"Advertising Space" (Live at the Velodrom in Berlin, Germany, 2005)	4:19
19.	"Life Thru a Lens" (Live at Élysée Montmartre in Paris, France, 1997)	4:12
20.	"Old Before I Die" (Live at Élysée Montmartre in Paris, France, 1997)	4:20
21.	"The Full Monty Medley" (With Tom Jones, Live at the Brit Awards 1998)	5:06
22.	"Angels" (Live at Glastonbury Festival in Pilton, England, 1998)	4:20
23.	"Millennium" (Live on the Late Show with David Letterman in New York City, United States, 1999)	3:29
24.	"It's Only Us" (Live at the Apocalypse Tube, 1999)	3:01
25.	"Kids" (Recorded with Kylie Minogue on Top of the Pops, 2000)	3:43
26.	"Better Man" (Recorded on Later... with Jools Holland, 2000)	3:24
27.	"Angels" (Live at Live 8 in London, England, 2005)	4:36
28.	"Advertising Space" (Recorded at Otro rollo con: Adal Ramones in Mexico City, Mexico, 2005)	4:36
29.	"White Christmas" (Recorded at Ant & Dec's Saturday Night Takeaway in London, England, 2005)	4:59
Total length:		125:18

Also on disc 2: Eternity 5:04

== Charts ==
Chart (2006)	Peak position
Australian Music DVDs Chart	1
Austrian Music DVDs Chart	1
Belgian (Flanders) Music DVDs Chart	1
Belgian (Wallonia) Music DVDs Chart	6
Danish Music DVDs Chart	2
Dutch Music DVDs Chart	1
Greek DVDs Chart	2
Hungarian DVDs Chart	2
Irish Music DVDs Chart	7
New Zealand Music DVDs Chart	10
Norwegian Music DVDs Chart	3
Spanish Music DVDs Chart	7
Swedish Music DVDs Chart	1

== Certifications ==
Region	Certification	Certified units/sales
Australia (ARIA)	6× Platinum	90,000^{^}
Austria (IFPI Austria)	Platinum	10,000^{*}
Denmark (IFPI Danmark)	Gold	20,000^{^}
France (SNEP)	2× Platinum	40,000^{*}
Germany (BVMI)	2× Platinum	100,000^{^}
Switzerland (IFPI Switzerland)	Gold	3,000^{^}
^{*} Sales figures based on certification alone.^{^} Shipments figures based on certification alone.
