= Close Encounters Tour =

2006 concert tour by Robbie Williams

- Tour by Robbie Williams
- Promotional advert for the tour
- Location: Africa; Asia; Europe; North America; Oceania; South America
- Associated album: Intensive Care
- Start date: 10 April 2006
- End date: 18 December 2006
- Legs: 4
- No. of shows: 57

Robbie Williams concert chronology
- 2003 Tour (2003); Close Encounters Tour (2006); Take the Crown Stadium Tour (2013)

The Close Encounters Tour was a concert tour by the English recording artist, Robbie Williams. Running from April to December 2006, the tour supported Williams' sixth studio album, Intensive Care. The tour saw Williams play over 50 shows in stadiums across Africa, Asia, Europe, Mexico, South America and Oceania. The name is derived from the 1977 film, Close Encounters of the Third Kind. The tour sold 1.6 million tickets on its first day of sale in November 2005, breaking the world record for the most concert tickets sold in a single day. Williams held the record for nearly 17 years, until it was broken by Taylor Swift's The Eras Tour, which sold 2.4 million tickets in a single day in November 2022.

== Opening acts ==
- Freshlyground (Africa)
- Chris Coco (Europe, South America, Australia)
- Basement Jaxx (Europe)
- Orson (Europe)
- Sneaky Sound System (Australia)
- La Portuaria (Buenos Aires)

== Set list ==
The following set list is that for the concert on 10 April 2006 at the ABSA Stadium in Durban, South Africa. It does not represent all concerts for the duration of the tour.

1. "Instrumental Sequence" (contains elements of "The Five Tones and Mountain Visions")
2. "Radio"
3. "Rock DJ"
4. "Tripping"
5. "Monsoon"
6. "Sin Sin Sin"
7. "Supreme"
8. "The Trouble With Me"
9. "Millennium"
10. "Back for Good"
11. "Advertising Space"
12. "There She Goes"
13. "Ghosts"
14. "Come Undone"
15. "Feel"
16. "A Place to Crash"
17. "Kids"
18. "Make Me Pure"

Encore

19. "Let Me Entertain You"
20. "Strong"
21. "Angels"

== Tour dates ==
List of 2006 concerts
Date	City	Country	Venue
10 April 2006	Durban	South Africa	ABSA Stadium
13 April 2006	Cape Town	South Africa	Green Point Stadium
17 April 2006	Pretoria	South Africa	Loftus Versfeld Stadium
21 April 2006	Dubai	United Arab Emirates	Nad Al Sheba Racecourse
9 June 2006	Dublin	Ireland	Croke Park
13 June 2006	Brussels	Belgium	Stade Roi Baudouin
14 June 2006	Brussels	Belgium	Stade Roi Baudouin
17 June 2006	Paris	France	Parc des Princes
21 June 2006	Amsterdam	Netherlands	Amsterdam Arena
22 June 2006	Amsterdam	Netherlands	Amsterdam Arena
24 June 2006	Amsterdam	Netherlands	Amsterdam Arena
25 June 2006	Amsterdam	Netherlands	Amsterdam Arena
1 July 2006	Gothenburg	Sweden	Ullevi
2 July 2006	Gothenburg	Sweden	Ullevi
6 July 2006	Copenhagen	Denmark	Parken Stadium
7 July 2006	Copenhagen	Denmark	Parken Stadium
10 July 2006	Dresden	Germany	Festwiese Ostragehege
11 July 2006	Dresden	Germany	Festwiese Ostragehege
14 July 2006	Hamburg	Germany	Trabrennbahn Bahrenfeld
15 July 2006	Hamburg	Germany	Trabrennbahn Bahrenfeld
19 July 2006	Budapest	Hungary	Ferenc Puskás Stadium
22 July 2006	Milan	Italy	San Siro
27 July 2006	Berlin	Germany	Olympiastadion
28 July 2006	Berlin	Germany	Olympiastadion
1 August 2006	Munich	Germany	Olympiastadion
2 August 2006	Munich	Germany	Olympiastadion
3 August 2006	Munich	Germany	Olympiastadion
8 August 2006	Cologne	Germany	Jahnwiese
9 August 2006	Cologne	Germany	Jahnwiese
12 August 2006	Hockenheim	Germany	Hockenheimring
13 August 2006	Hockenheim	Germany	Hockenheimring
18 August 2006	Vienna	Austria	Ernst-Happel-Stadion
19 August 2006	Vienna	Austria	Ernst-Happel-Stadion
23 August 2006	Bern	Switzerland	Stade de Suisse
24 August 2006	Bern	Switzerland	Stade de Suisse
1 September 2006	Glasgow	Scotland	Hampden Park
2 September 2006	Glasgow	Scotland	Hampden Park
8 September 2006	Leeds	England	Roundhay Park
9 September 2006	Leeds	England	Roundhay Park
14 September 2006	Milton Keynes	England	National Bowl
15 September 2006	Milton Keynes	England	National Bowl
16 September 2006	Milton Keynes	England	National Bowl
18 September 2006	Milton Keynes	England	National Bowl
19 September 2006	Milton Keynes	England	National Bowl
10 October 2006	Santiago	Chile	Estadio Nacional
14 October 2006	Buenos Aires	Argentina	River Plate Stadium
15 October 2006	Buenos Aires	Argentina	River Plate Stadium
18 October 2006	Rio de Janeiro	Brazil	Praça da Apoteose
21 October 2006	Mexico City	Mexico	Foro Sol
22 October 2006	Mexico City	Mexico	Foro Sol
30 November 2006	Perth	Australia	Subiaco Oval
1 December 2006	Perth	Australia	Subiaco Oval
5 December 2006	Adelaide	Australia	AAMI Stadium
9 December 2006	Sydney	Australia	Aussie Stadium
10 December 2006	Sydney	Australia	Aussie Stadium
13 December 2006	Brisbane	Australia	Suncorp Stadium
14 December 2006	Brisbane	Australia	Suncorp Stadium
17 December 2006	Melbourne	Australia	Telstra Dome
18 December 2006	Melbourne	Australia	Telstra Dome

Cancellations and rescheduled shows

14 September 2006	London, England	Wembley Stadium	Relocated to the National Bowl in Milton Keynes due to the incompletion of Wembley Stadium.
15 September 2006	London, England	Wembley Stadium	Relocated to the National Bowl in Milton Keynes due to the incompletion of Wembley Stadium.
16 September 2006	London, England	Wembley Stadium	Relocated to the National Bowl in Milton Keynes due to the incompletion of Wembley Stadium.
18 September 2006	London, England	Wembley Stadium	Relocated to the National Bowl in Milton Keynes due to the incompletion of Wembley Stadium.
19 September 2006	London, England	Wembley Stadium	Relocated to the National Bowl in Milton Keynes due to the incompletion of Wembley Stadium.
8 October 2006	Caracas, Venezuela	Estadio Universitario	Cancelled
4 November 2006	Shanghai, China	Hongkou Football Stadium	Cancelled
10 November 2006	Chek Lap Kok, Hong Kong	AsiaWorld–Arena	Cancelled
14 November 2006	Bangkok, Thailand	Aktiv Square	Cancelled
18 November 2006	Kallang, Singapore	National Stadium	Cancelled
22 November 2006	Mumbai, India	Brabourne Stadium	Cancelled
24 November 2006	Bangalore, India	Bangalore Palace Grounds	Cancelled

=== Box office score data ===
Venue	City	Tickets sold / Available	Gross revenue
Foro Sol	Mexico City	102,956 / 108,414 (95%)	$3,626,856

== See also ==
- List of fastest-selling concert tours
