= The Robbie Williams Show =

Video by Robbie Williams
- Released: March 2003
- Recorded: 2002
- Genre: Pop
- Label: EMI
- Director: Hamish Hamilton
- Producer: Lee Lodge

Robbie Williams chronology
The Robbie Williams Show (2003)	What We Did Last Summer (2003)

The Robbie Williams Show is a live DVD and VHS video by Robbie Williams, recorded in 2002 in Pinewood Studios before the release of the album Escapology. Many of the album's songs were performed for the first time here, with Robbie jokingly declaring to some fans that they may have already heard some of the new songs (such as "Something Beautiful"), but only through unauthorized Internet leaks.

== Track listing ==
1. "Trouble"/"Handsome Man" (from Escapology)
2. "Rock DJ" (from Sing When You're Winning)
3. "Strong" (from I've Been Expecting You)
4. "Something Beautiful" (from Escapology)
5. "Feel" (from Escapology)
6. "Have You Met Miss Jones?" (from Swing When You're Winning)
7. "Mr. Bojangles" (from Swing When You're Winning)
8. "One for My Baby (and One More for the Road)" (from Swing When You're Winning)
9. "Ain't That a Kick in the Head?" (from Swing When You're Winning)
10. "Monsoon" (from Escapology)
11. "Hot Fudge" (from Escapology)
12. "No Regrets" (from I've Been Expecting You)
13. "Nan's Song" (from Escapology)
14. "Me and My Monkey" (from Escapology)
15. "One Fine Day" (from Come Undone)
16. "Come Undone" (from Escapology)
17. "Angels" (from Life thru a Lens)

The songs "Nan's Song" and "One Fine Day" both feature Robbie Williams on acoustic guitar.

The show's opening number, "Trouble"/"Handsome Man", is identical in concept and staging to the opening sequence of Elvis Presley's '68 Comeback Special, down to the same opening song ("Trouble") with the same arrangement. The only differences are the huge RW logo with arrows in red lights (replacing the ELVIS one), and female dancers on the jail cell back-drop holding microphones, instead of male ones holding guitars. The stage sets in the show are also similar to the ones used in the live concert segments of Presley's TV special.

== Extras ==
- Extra songs from the show:
1. "How Peculiar"
2. "Feel"
3. "Sexed Up"
4. "Revolution"
- What a performance: behind the scenes documentary
- Photo gallery
- Lights game (Easter egg: "Sweet Home Alabama")
- Credits

== Certifications ==
Region	Certification	Certified units/sales
Australia (ARIA)	6× Platinum	90,000^{^}
Austria (IFPI Austria)	Platinum	10,000^{*}
France (SNEP)	Platinum	20,000^{*}
Germany (BVMI)	Platinum	50,000^{^}
United Kingdom (BPI)	Platinum	50,000^{^}
^{*} Sales figures based on certification alone.^{^} Shipments figures based on certification alone.
