= What We Did Last Summer =

Video by Robbie Williams
- Released: 24 November 2003
- Recorded: 1–3 August 2003
- Genre: Pop
- Length: 122:00
- Label: Chrysalis
- Director: Hamish Hamilton
- Producer: Lee Lodge

Robbie Williams chronology
The Robbie Williams Show (2003)	What We Did Last Summer (2003)	And Through It All: Robbie Williams Live 1997–2006 (2006)

What We Did Last Summer – Robbie Williams: Live at Knebworth is a live DVD by Robbie Williams, recorded between 1–3 August 2003 at Knebworth, England, as part of the Weekends of Mass Distraction Tour, the second-last venue on the first leg of the tour.

The album is a DVD companion to the live album Live at Knebworth (also known as Live Summer 2003).

== Track listing ==
1. "Let Me Entertain You" (from Life thru a Lens)
2. "Let Love Be Your Energy" (from Sing When You're Winning)
3. "We Will Rock You" (from Queen's News of the World)
4. "Monsoon" (from Escapology)
5. "Come Undone" (from Escapology)
6. "Strong" (from I've Been Expecting You)
7. "Me and My Monkey" (from Escapology)
8. "Hot Fudge" (from Escapology)
9. "Mr Bojangles" (from Swing When You're Winning)
10. "She's the One" (from I've Been Expecting You)
11. "Supreme" (from Sing When You're Winning)
12. "No Regrets" (from I've Been Expecting You)
13. "Kids" (from Sing When You're Winning)
14. "Better Man" (from Sing When You're Winning)
15. "Made Up Song"
16. "Nan's Song" (from Escapology)
17. "Feel" (from Escapology)
18. "Rock DJ" (from Sing When You're Winning)
19. "Angels" (from Life thru a Lens)

The songs "Nan's Song", "Better Man" and "Made Up Song" all feature Robbie Williams on acoustic guitar.

The show's opening with Williams making an entrance hanging upside down on a bungee rope is identical to him doing the same on the cover of his newly released album Escapology. Williams entrance was accompanied by "Let Me Entertain You", a song he often uses as the first song.

As he often does, Williams dedicated his 12th song "No Regrets" to his former Take That bandmates Gary Barlow, Jason Orange, Mark Owen and Howard Donald.

The performance of "Back for Good" on the third night by Williams and Owen was not included in the main section of the DVD.

== Extras ==
- Behind the Scenes Documentary: Moments of Mass Distractions
- Fans Diaries
- Interactive Game
- Gallery
- 'More Precious Than Gold' – UNICEF film narrated by Robbie Williams

== Charts ==
=== Weekly charts ===
Chart performance for What We Did Last Summer
Chart (2003–06)	Peak position
Australian Music DVD (ARIA)	1
Austrian Music DVD (Ö3 Austria)	1
Danish Music DVD (Hitlisten)	2
Dutch Music DVD (MegaCharts)	1
Greek Music DVD (IFPI)	5
Irish Music DVD (IRMA)	4
Italian Music DVD (FIMI)	3
New Zealand Music DVD (RMNZ)	1
Norwegian Music DVD (VG-lista)	7
Portuguese Music DVD (AFP)	2

Chart (2003)	Peak position
Spanish Music DVDs Chart	15
Swiss Albums Chart	18

Chart (2006)	Peak position
Belgian (Flanders) Music DVDs Chart	2
Belgian (Wallonia) Music DVDs Chart	2

== Certifications ==
Certifications for What We Did Last Summer
Region	Certification	Certified units/sales
Argentina (CAPIF)	Platinum	8,000^{^}
Australia (ARIA)	12× Platinum	180,000^{^}
Austria (IFPI Austria)	3× Platinum	30,000^{*}
France (SNEP)	2× Platinum	40,000^{*}
Germany (BVMI)	11× Gold	275,000^{^}
Mexico (AMPROFON)	Gold	10,000^{^}
Portugal (AFP)	12× Platinum	96,000^{^}
United Kingdom (BPI)	7× Platinum	350,000^{^}
^{*} Sales figures based on certification alone.^{^} Shipments figures based on certification alone.
