= Intensive Care (album) =

Studio album by Robbie Williams
- Released: 24 October 2005
- Recorded: June 2003–May 2005 in Los Angeles
- Genre: Pop rock
- Length: 53:02
- Label: Chrysalis / EMI
- Producers: Robbie Williams; Stephen Duffy

Robbie Williams chronology
Greatest Hits (2004)	Intensive Care (2005)	Rudebox (2006)

Singles from Intensive Care
- 1. "Tripping" Released: 3 October 2005; 2. "Make Me Pure" Released: 14 November 2005; 3. "Advertising Space" Released: 12 December 2005; 4. "Sin Sin Sin" Released: 22 May 2006

Intensive Care is the sixth studio album by English singer-songwriter Robbie Williams, released on 24 October 2005 in the United Kingdom. It was produced by Stephen Duffy and Williams and was the first of Williams' albums to not be co-written and produced by longtime songwriting partner Guy Chambers, with whom Williams had co-written all his albums until that point.

The album was supported by four singles, including "Tripping", which was released as the lead single on October 3, 2005, and reached number two in the United Kingdom, while topping the charts in Germany, Italy and the Netherlands. It also topped the European Hot 100 Singles chart, becoming Europe's eighth-most-successful song of 2005. The song became a worldwide success for Williams, debuting inside the top 10 in most countries around Europe. "Make Me Pure", was released as the albums' second single on November 14, 2005. "Advertising Space" was released as the third single on December 12, 2005, and was a top-ten hit in many European countries, including the United Kingdom and Germany. "Sin Sin Sin" was released as the final single on May 22, 2006.

Like most of Williams' previous albums, Intensive Care topped the charts in many countries. To support Intensive Care, Williams embarked on the Close Encounters Tour across Africa, Asia, Australia, Europe, North America and South America, in 2006. The tour saw Williams play over 50 shows in stadiums, starting on April 10, 2006, in Durban, South Africa and ending on December 18, 2006, in Melbourne, Australia. Williams broke the world record for the most concert tickets sold in a single day in November 2005, when the tour sold 1.6 million tickets on its first day of sale.

== Background ==
After the release of Escapology, Williams and his long-time songwriting partner Guy Chambers, with whom Williams had written most of his most popular hit-songs up to that point, had parted ways due to several disputes that arose during the recording of the album. Williams later admitted that he wanted full control over his work. He became increasingly frustrated with people assuming that his greatest songs were solely the product of Chambers' talent. After touring Latin America in late 2004 for the promotion of his Greatest Hits album, Williams began working in earnest on what would become his sixth studio album. Recorded in his bedroom in the Hollywood Hills, the album was co-written by Stephen Duffy over the course of 24 months.

The album's artwork was designed by Grant Morrison and Frank Quitely, in response to Williams' request that they "turn [Williams] into a superhero" for the tour. The "talismanic images" and "witchy hieroglyphs" include a "sigil" that, in Morrison's words, "can be activated by finding the CD in the shops or pulling the cover up on-screen and pressing Rob's finger. If enough of us do this the world will most certainly enter a new Golden Age of peace, creativity, and prosperity!"

== Production ==
In mid- 2003, Williams was recording music for the soundtrack of the musical biopic De-Lovely at Air Studios, in London. During a break in recording, he encountered Stephen Duffy, who was also working on music in the same building, inside a smaller studio. Though Williams had previously met Duffy and spoken to him about a potential musical collaboration, they had never written music together before. Duffy later recalled: "Literally a month after I'd finished Keep Going, Rob knocked on my door at AIR and said 'Shall we write a couple of songs?'". After chatting for about 10 minutes, they both agreed to begin work on some musical ideas, with Williams hoping to write at least one "weird" folk-inspired song. Several hours later, as Williams returned to the studio after a break, he found a CD containing two instrumental demo recordings composed by Duffy and a note for himself. After listening to the two demos, and beginning to vocalise improvised melodies on top of the instrumental, Williams left Duffy a message, saying he will try to come to the studio the following week to continue work.

Williams started writing and recording demos for what would become Intensive Care on 12 June 2003 at Air Studios alongside Stephen Duffy, days before kicking off his Weekends Of Mass Distractions Tour, in support of his previous album Escapology. On that particular day, Duffy played Williams a backing track and Williams started creating the melody and lyrics of the song "Sin Sin Sin". After the first writing session with Duffy, Williams decided that the song which was to become Sin Sin Sin, sounded nothing like what he had done previously and that he does not wish to continue doing the type of music he had done up to that point. Williams came up with the idea of developing a character and wearing a wig and prosthetic nose during the promotional campaign of the album. Williams wanted to release his next record, after the release of his Greatest Hits album, under the pseudonym Pure Francis, an imaginary American alcoholic from Orange County who has moved to West Hollywood, that Williams likened to Neil Diamond.

Williams' hope was to craft his best album, without any comedic elements to it and with Neil Diamond, Kraftwerk and Depeche Mode influences. His early idea for a title was Diamond. Duffy agreed to Williams’ concept. During the next session, Williams and Duffy wrote the song A Place To Crash. Duffy later admitted that it was "amazing fun" writing and recording songs with Williams and described the process as follows: "We jammed. We spent hours just kind of… he played bass, I played guitar, he played the synth, I played the maracas. So everything came from a completely different place." Writing and recording continued throughout the summer of 2003. The album's lead single, Tripping, was written in late 2003 in Los Angeles. Williams wrote the bass-line for the song and the falsetto chorus line, with Duffy programming electronic drums and writing the "want you to love me" chorus section. Thus the song's initial idea was born.

By March 2004, the songwriting duo had already recorded several demos including "Sin Sin Sin", "Radio" (which would be released on the Greatest Hits compilation in late 2004), "Ghosts", "Tripping Underwater" (which would later become "Tripping"), "The Trouble With Me" and "Misunderstood" (which would also be released on the Greatest Hits compilation in late 2004). A Place To Crash was initially a contender for the Greatest Hits compilation. In January and February 2005, Williams and Duffy wrote Make Me Pure and Advertising Space on acoustic guitars. Duffy explained that, contrary to the songs they had written up to that point, which had an electronic sound to them, Make Me Pure was the first song they recorded using live instrumentation. He added that it was written very quickly, in a matter of hours.

== Release and promotion ==
The album was launched in Berlin, Germany on 9 October 2005 with a special one-off concert. It was broadcast to various locations around the world in cinemas and theatres, in a high-definition "cine-cast" and was shown on Saturday 22 October 2005 on Channel 4. Williams performed 8 of the 12 songs from the album at the live concert.

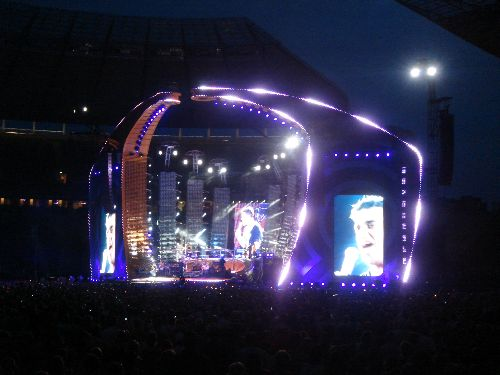
Robbie Williams performing during the Close Encounters Tour at the Olympiastadion in Berlin, Germany on July 27, 2006

When Intensive Care was released in October 2005, it became a smash hit around the world, hitting number-one in the United Kingdom, as well as topping charts in twenty other counties including Argentina, Australia, Austria, Germany, Sweden, Switzerland, The Netherlands, New Zealand and many other countries. It sold 373,832 copies in its first week in the United Kingdom alone. Following the success of the album, Williams won the MTV Europe Music Award for 'Best Male', and also entered The Guinness Book of World Records for selling 1.6 million tickets in a single day for his 2006 world tour, called the Close Encounters Tour. The album became the best selling album in Europe by the end of 2005, with sales of over four million copies. However, it only managed to become the third best selling album in the United Kingdom that year.

In January 2007, it was revealed Intensive Care had sold over 5 million copies in Europe, and as such, was certified 5× Platinum by the IFPI. It was also certified 5× Platinum in the United Kingdom around the same time. In Mexico, the album was certified platinum shortly after its release, and later Platinum+Gold in 2006, for shipping 150,000 copies of the physical album. In December 2008 the album was certified 2× diamond for pre-loaded sales of 1,000,000 copies. By shipping 1,100,000 copies and reaching 11× gold, Intensive Care became the eighth best-selling album of the decade in Germany. It also became Williams' fifth album to reach a position in the top twenty of the best-selling album of the decade, with Swing When You're Winning, Escapology, Live at Knebworth and Greatest Hits also earning places. According to EMI, the album has sold 6.2 million copies worldwide.

Williams kicked off his Close Encounters Tour in South Africa in April 2006 in promotion of the album. More than 2.5 million attended the early stages of the tour, with nearly three million having been reported to have seen one or more shows.

== Critical reception ==
Professional ratings
Aggregate scores
Source	Rating
Metacritic	64/100
Review scores
Source	Rating
AllMusic	2.5/5 stars
The Guardian	4/5 stars
Mojo	3/5 stars
NOW	3/5 stars
The Observer	3/5 stars
PopMatters	7/10
Q	3/5 stars
Sputnikmusic	3/5 stars
Uncut	3/5 stars
Yahoo! Music UK	6/10

Intensive Care received a varied response from music critics. Alexis Petridis from The Guardian gave the album four out of five stars, writing: "The lovely, lambent melodies of 'Advertising Space' and 'The King of Bloke and Bird' may well be Duffy, the Smiths-like guitar of 'Spread Your Wings' and the autoharp on 'Please Don't Die' definitely is, but their epic qualities seem to stem entirely from Williams."

Lucy Davies from BBC Music gave the album a positive rating stating that: "Williams is putting more self reflection and understanding in his music than ever before, and he's a rich seam of material. Gloriously imperfect, the personality makes the album, and it's his best yet."

John Bush from AllMusic gave the album two and a half stars out of five. He praised songs like "Ghosts", "Tripping" and "Spread Your Wings", but felt that "Duffy's arrangement is a pale shadow of a Smiths song from 20 years earlier." He concluded that the album is "much more interesting than the creatively bankrupt Escapology."

== Singles ==
- "Tripping" was released as the album's lead single on 3 October 2005, becoming an international success, topping the charts in Germany, The Netherlands, Taiwan, Argentina and Mexico. In the United Kingdom, it was released as a double A-side with "Make Me Pure". However, "Make Me Pure" was also released separately in Australia, New Zealand and Mexico.
- "Advertising Space" was released as the album's second single in December 2005, becoming another international hit, reaching the top ten in Europe, Australasia and Latin America.
- "Sin Sin Sin" was released as the album's third and final single in the summer of 2006. It was the first song Williams and Stephen Duffy co-wrote together. The video was shot in Cape Town, South Africa just days before the start of Williams' tour there. It became Williams' first single to miss the UK Top 20, charting at number twenty-two, however, it performed much better internationally, hitting the top ten in Europe and Latin America.

== Track listing ==
All tracks are written by Robbie Williams and Stephen Duffy, except where noted.

Intensive Care – Standard edition
No.	Title	Length
1.	"Ghosts"	3:42
2.	"Tripping"	4:36
3.	"Make Me Pure" (Williams, Duffy, Chris Heath)	4:33
4.	"Spread Your Wings"	3:50
5.	"Advertising Space"	4:37
6.	"Please Don't Die"	4:47
7.	"Your Gay Friend"	3:21
8.	"Sin Sin Sin" (Williams, Duffy, Heath)	4:09
9.	"Random Acts of Kindness"	4:15
10.	"The Trouble with Me"	4:20
11.	"A Place to Crash"	4:34
12.	"King of Bloke and Bird"	6:13

Intensive Care – Additional recordings
No.	Title	Length
13.	"Meet the Stars"
14.	"Bag Full of Silly" (Williams, Duffy, Heath)	4:17
15.	"Don't Stop Talking"
16.	"Family Coach"	4:48
17.	"Twist"
18.	"Don't Say No"
19.	"Overture for Berlin"
20.	"Our Love"	4:14

Intensive Care – Special edition bonus DVD
No.	Title	Length
1.	"In Intensive Care" (Documentary)
2.	"Make Me Pure" (music video)
3.	"Tripping" (Tarot Card Visuals)

Intensive Care – RW 20th Anniversary edition bonus DVD
No.	Title	Length
1.	"Radio" (Live on TOTP)
2.	"Radio" (Live on Later... with Jools Holland)
3.	"Misunderstood" (Live on TOTP)
4.	"Trouble with Me" (Live on TOTP)
5.	"Tripping" (Live on Later... with Jools Holland)
6.	"Ghosts" (Live on Later... with Jools Holland)
7.	"A Place to Crash" (Live on Later... with Jools Holland)
8.	"Advertising Space" (Live on TOTP Christmas special)
9.	"Misunderstood" (Live in Germany)
10.	"Tripping" (Live in Spain)

== Musicians ==
- Robbie Williams: lead and backing vocals, guitars, synthesizer (tracks 4 and 10), bass guitar (track 2)
- Stephen Duffy: guitars, keyboards, synthesizers, sequencers, percussion, autoharp (tracks 6 and 11), sitar (track 11), dilruba (track 11), melodica (track 2), glockenspiel (track 2), harmonica (track 9), wine glass (track 12)
- Claire Worrall: backing vocals (track 11), piano, Wurlitzer electric piano, Mellotron, Hammond B3 organ
- Melvin Duffy: pedal steel guitar (track 11)
- Neil Taylor: guitar (tracks 1, 9 and 11)
- Greg Leisz: guitars, pedal and lap steel guitars, Ebow
- Justin Duarte: acoustic guitar
- Jerry Meehan: bass guitar
- Matt Chamberlain: drums, percussion
- Kate Kissoon: backing vocals
- Tessa Niles: backing vocals
- Jeff Babko: trombone (track 11)
- Cleto Escobedo: baritone saxophone (track 11)
- Waddy Wachtel: guitar (tracks 6 and 11)
- Jebin Bruni: synthesizers (tracks 5 and 8), ARP String Ensemble (track 4), Chamberlin (track 4)
- Davey Faragher: bass guitar (tracks 6 and 8)
- John Paterno: guitar
- Buddy Judge: guitar
- Max Beesley: percussion, vibraphone (tracks 2 and 10), synthesizer (track 2)
- Gary Nuttall: backing vocals (track 11)
- Carlton E. Anderson: choir (tracks 3 and 11)
- Maxi Anderson: choir (tracks 3 and 11)
- Randy Crenshaw: choir (tracks 3 and 11)
- Judith Hill: choir (tracks 3 and 11)
- Julia Tillman: choir (tracks 3 and 11)
- Carmen Twillie: choir (tracks 3 and 11)
- Oren Waters: choir (tracks 3 and 11)
- Maxine Waters Willard: choir (tracks 3 and 11)
- Will Wheaton Jnr: choir (tracks 3 and 11)
- Terry Wood: choir (tracks 3 and 11)
- Charlie Bisharat: violins (tracks 1, 2, 3, 5, 6, 8, 10 and 12)
- Mario De Leon: violins (tracks 1, 3, 5, 6 and 8)
- Armen Garabedian: violins (tracks 1, 2, 3, 5, 10 and 12)
- Berj Garabedian: violins (tracks 1, 3, 5, 6 and 8)
- Alan Grunfeld: violins (tracks 1, 3 and 5)
- Sara Pakins: violins (tracks 1, 2, 3, 5, 6, 8, 10 and 12)
- Michelle Richards: violins (tracks 1, 2, 3, 5, 6, 8, 10 and 12)
- Sarah Thornblade: violins (tracks 1, 3, 5, 6 and 8)
- Josefina Vergara: violins (tracks 1, 2, 3, 5, 6, 8, 10 and 12)
- John Wittenburg: violins (tracks 1, 2, 3, 5, 6, 8, 10 and 12)
- Denyse Buffum: violins (tracks 1, 2, 3, 5, 6, 8, 10 and 12)
- Matt Funes: cello
- Roland Kato: cello
- Evan Wilson: cello
- Larry Corbett: cello
- Suzie Katayama: cello
- Dan Smith: cello

== Credits ==
- Album produced by Stephen Duffy and Robbie Williams
- Original production by Andy Strange
- Mixed by Bob Clearmountain at Mix This!
- Engineered by John Paterno, Andy Strange, Stephen Duffy Pablo Munguia, Tony Phillips, Adam Noble and Dan Porter
- Strings arranged and conducted by David Campbell
- Strings engineered by Alan Sides at NRG
- Mastering by Tony Cousins at Metropolis Studios, London
- A&R: Chris Briggs
- Photography: Hamish Brown
- Design and artwork: Grant Morrison and Frank Quitely
- Art co-ordination by Tom Hingston Studio

== Charts ==
=== Weekly charts ===
Chart (2005)	Peak position
Argentine Albums (CAPIF)	1
Australian Albums (ARIA)	1
Austrian Albums (Ö3 Austria)	1
Belgian Albums (Ultratop Flanders)	1
Belgian Albums (Ultratop Wallonia)	1
Croatian International Albums (TOTS)	1
Danish Albums (Hitlisten)	1
European Albums (Billboard)	1
Dutch Albums (Album Top 100)	1
Finnish Albums (Suomen virallinen lista)	3
French Albums (SNEP)	2
German Albums (Offizielle Top 100)	1
Greek Albums (IFPI)	2
Hungarian Albums (MAHASZ)	2
Irish Albums (IRMA)	1
Italian Albums (FIMI)	1
Japanese Albums (Oricon)	128
Mexican Albums (Top 100 Mexico)	2
New Zealand Albums (RMNZ)	1
Norwegian Albums (VG-lista)	2
Polish Albums (ZPAV)	11
Portuguese Albums (AFP)	1
Spanish Albums (Promusicae)	1
Swedish Albums (Sverigetopplistan)	1
Swiss Albums (Schweizer Hitparade)	1
Taiwanese Albums (Five Music)	1
UK Albums (Official Charts)	1

=== Year-end charts ===
Chart (2005)	Position
Argentine Albums (CAPIF)	16
Australian Albums (ARIA)	22
Austrian Albums (Ö3 Austria)	3
Belgian Albums (Ultratop Flanders)	11
Belgian Alternative Albums (Ultratop Flanders)	9
Belgian Albums (Ultratop Wallonia)	10
Danish Albums (Hitlisten)	2
Dutch Albums (Album Top 100)	3
European Albums (Billboard)	12
Finnish Albums (Suomen viralinen lista)	1
French Albums (SNEP)	12
German Albums (Offizielle Top 100)	7
Hungarian Albums (MAHASZ)	29
Irish Albums (IRMA)	12
Italian Albums (FIMI)	6
Mexican Albums (Top 100 Mexico)	27
New Zealand Albums (RMNZ)	44
Spanish Albums (PROMUSICAE)	45
Swedish Albums (Sverigetopplistan)	13
Swedish Albums & Compilations (Sverigetopplistan)	14
Swiss Albums (Schweizer Hitparade)	1
UK Albums (OCC)	3
Worldwide Albums (IFPI)	10

Chart (2006)	Position
Australian Albums (ARIA)	32
Austrian Albums (Ö3 Austria)	3
Belgian Albums (Ultratop Flanders)	34
Belgian Alternative Albums (Ultratop Flanders)	19
Belgian Albums (Ultratop Wallonia)	21
Danish Albums (Hitlisten)	34
Dutch Albums (Album Top 100)	18
European Albums (Billboard)	4
French Albums (SNEP)	18
German Albums (Offizielle Top 100)	8
Hungarian Albums (MAHASZ)	94
Italian Albums (FIMI)	23
Mexican Albums (Top 100 Mexico)	35
Swedish Albums (Sverigetopplistan)	51
Swedish Albums & Compilations (Sverigetopplistan)	65
Swiss Albums (Schweizer Hitparade)	2
UK Albums (OCC)	128

=== Decade-end charts ===
Chart (2000–2009)	Position
UK Albums (OCC)	55

== Certifications and sales ==
Region	Certification	Certified units/sales
Argentina (CAPIF)	3× Platinum	120,000^{^}
Australia (ARIA)	3× Platinum	210,000^{^}
Austria (IFPI Austria)	3× Platinum	90,000^{*}
Belgium (BRMA)	2× Platinum	100,000^{*}
Denmark (IFPI Danmark)	2× Platinum	80,000^{^}
Finland (Musiikkituottajat)	Platinum	62,524
France (SNEP)	2× Platinum	400,000^{*}
Germany (BVMI)	11× Gold	1,100,000^{^}
Greece (IFPI Greece)	Gold	10,000^{^}
Hungary (MAHASZ)	Platinum	10,000^{^}
Ireland (IRMA)	5× Platinum	75,000^{^}
Italy (FIMI)	Platinum	282,000
Mexico (AMPROFON)	Platinum+Gold	150,000^{^}
Mexico (AMPROFON) Pre-loaded	2× Diamond	1,000,000^{^}
Netherlands (NVPI)	2× Platinum	160,000^{^}
New Zealand (RMNZ)	Platinum	15,000^{^}
Poland	—	14,000
Portugal (AFP)	Platinum	20,000^{^}
Russia (NFPF)	Gold	10,000^{*}
Spain (Promusicae)	Platinum	100,000^{^}
Sweden (GLF)	Platinum	60,000^{^}
Switzerland (IFPI Switzerland)	3× Platinum	120,000^{^}
United Kingdom (BPI)	5× Platinum	1,619,894
Summaries
Europe (IFPI)	5× Platinum	5,000,000^{*}
Worldwide	—	6,200,000
^{*} Sales figures based on certification alone.^{^} Shipments figures based on certification alone.

== See also ==
- List of best-selling albums of the 2000s (decade) in the United Kingdom
