= Knebworth Festival =

Open-air rock and pop concert

Coordinates: 51.8744°N 0.2189°W

Knebworth Festival

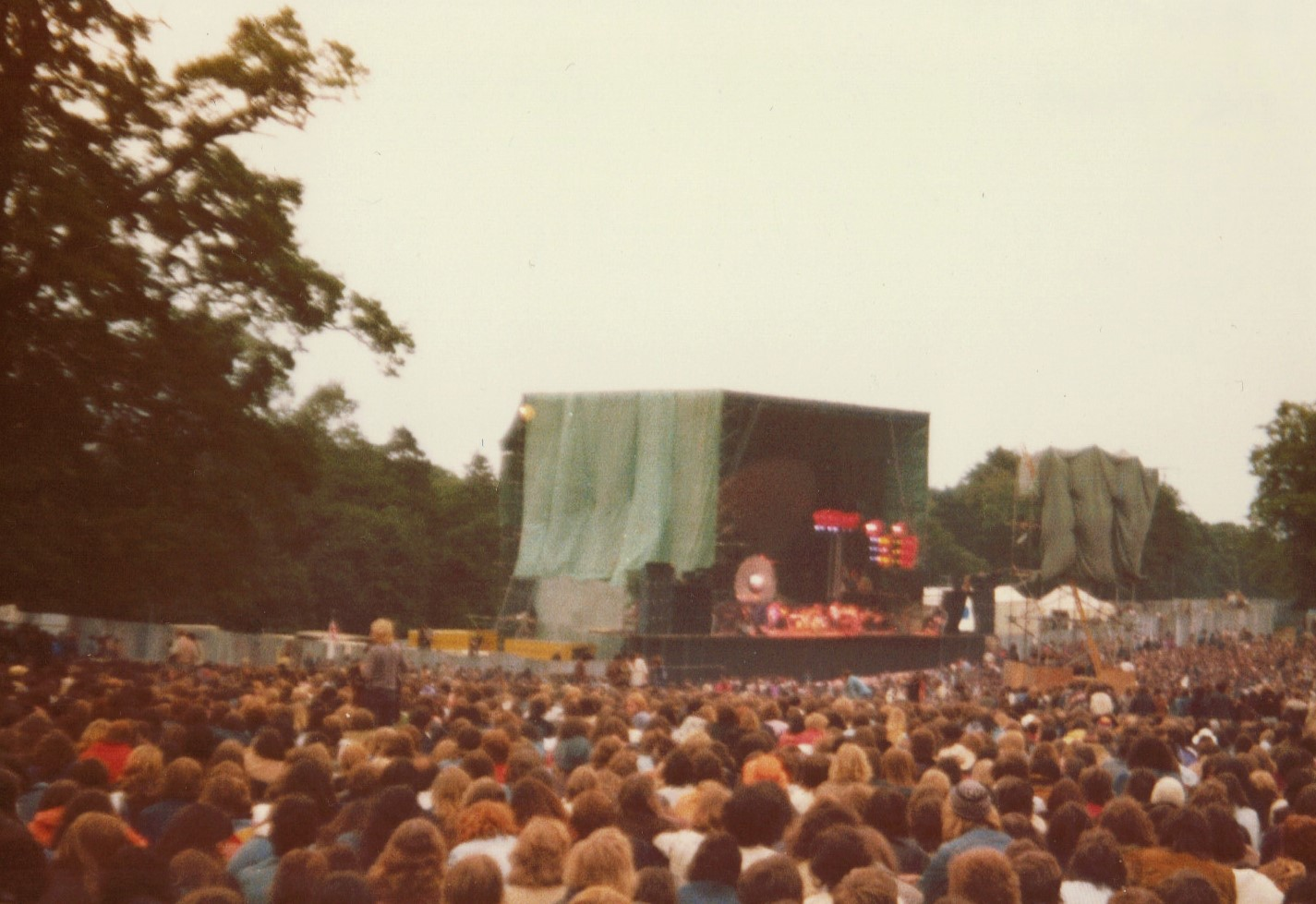
Pink Floyd in 1975

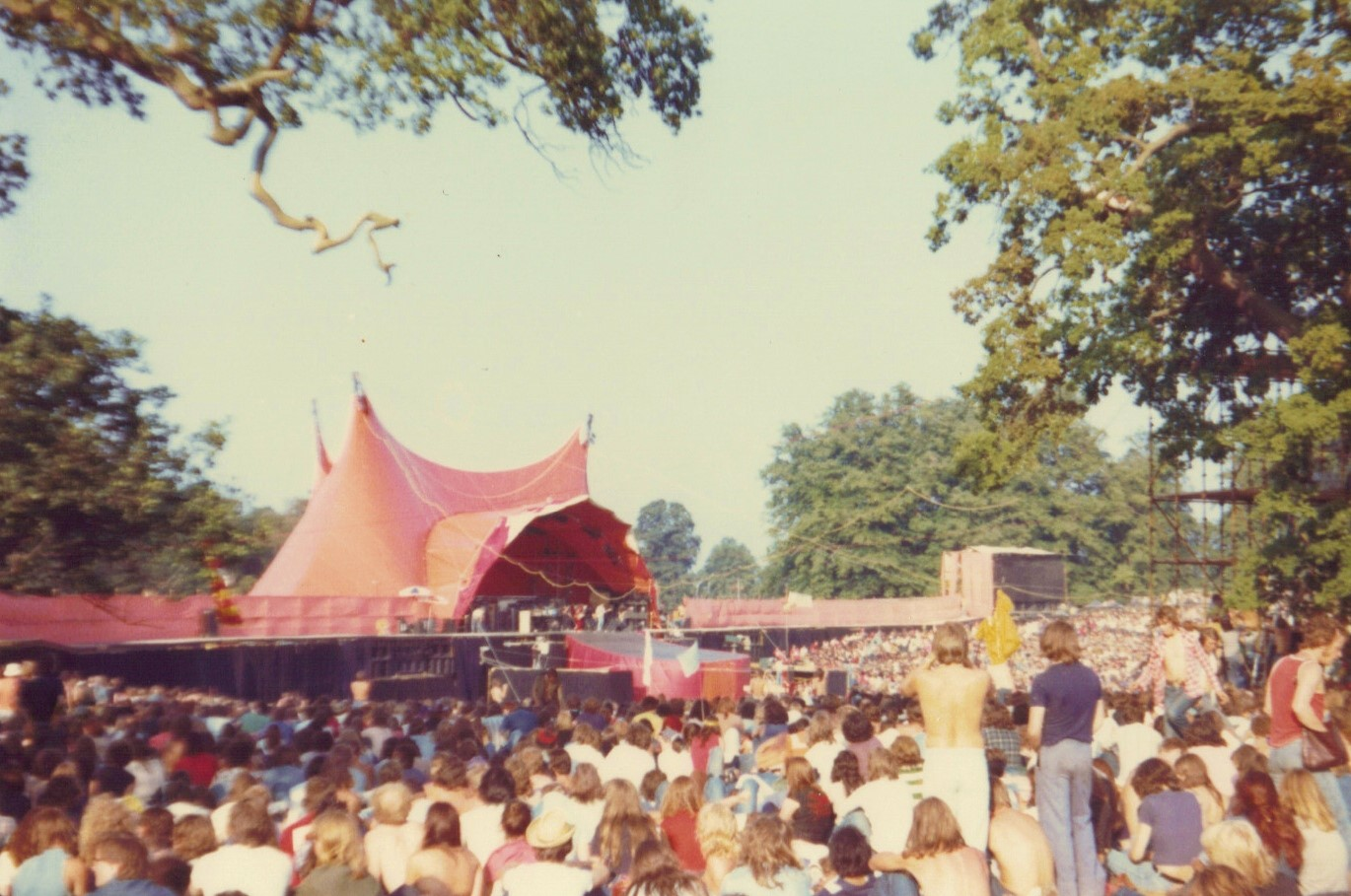
The Rolling Stones in 1976

The Knebworth Festival is a recurring open-air rock and pop festival held on the grounds of Knebworth House in Knebworth, England. The festival first occurred in July 1974 when the Allman Brothers Band, the Doobie Brothers and other artists attracted 60,000 people. It happened irregularly under several different names until 2022.

The venue has hosted numerous outdoor concerts, featuring artists including the Rolling Stones, Lynyrd Skynyrd, Pink Floyd, Genesis, Frank Zappa, Captain Beefheart and the Magic Band, Led Zeppelin, the Beach Boys, Elkie Brooks, Deep Purple, Queen, Status Quo, Paul McCartney, Eric Clapton, Elton John, Phil Collins, Robert Plant, Dire Straits, Mike Oldfield, Iron Maiden, Metallica, the Red Hot Chili Peppers, Robbie Williams, and Oasis.

== Major concerts ==
- The Rolling Stones played in front of an estimated 200,000 at Knebworth in August 1976.
- In 1979, Led Zeppelin performed at Knebworth for two concerts, their first concerts in the United Kingdom since 1975. The band reportedly played to record crowds in excess of 200,000 people, even though official admission records only list 109,000 people. The New Barbarians, Ron Wood's solo outfit with Keith Richards played at the second show on 11 August. Support bands included Fairport Convention and Chas and Dave.
- The Beach Boys headlined the 1980 Knebworth concert, which would prove to be the last UK performance of the band's original lineup. Drummer Dennis Wilson would die in 1983 from drowning. Part of their set was released on CD and DVD in 2002 as Good Timin': Live at Knebworth England 1980.
- The 1985 event was the first UK concert by the re-formed Deep Purple.
- On 9 August 1986, Queen performed their last concert with their original lineup (Freddie Mercury, Brian May, Roger Taylor and John Deacon) in what was Freddie Mercury's final show with the band. Biographer Mark Blake writes, "the official attendance was 120,000, but in reality the audience was closer to 200,000." Queen roadie Peter Hince states, "At Knebworth, I somehow felt it was going to be the last for all of us", while May recalled Mercury saying "I'm not going to be doing this forever. This is probably the last time." Queen did not perform live again until after Mercury's death, at his tribute concert at Wembley Stadium in April 1992.
- On 30 June 1990, the park was the location for The Silver Clef Award Winners Concert which was recorded with highlights released on LP and compact disc, along with home video on VHS and laserdisc later that year, with a newly remixed edition released on DVD in 2002. A Blu-ray edition with upscaled SD video and high resolution audio (LPCM stereo and DTS-HD Master Audio 5.1) was released in Europe in 2015. It included the performances of artists including Pink Floyd, Cliff Richard and the Shadows, Tears for Fears, Eric Clapton, Dire Straits, Elton John, Paul McCartney, Robert Plant (with Jimmy Page), Phil Collins, Status Quo and Genesis. Pink Floyd's complete set was released with newly remixed audio on multiple formats (180-gram 45 r.p.m. double LP, compact disc and digital platforms) on 30 April 2021.
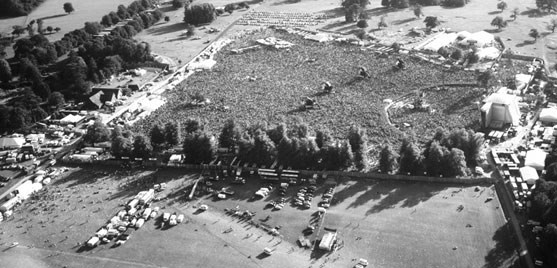
  Oasis at Knebworth
- In 1996, Oasis, who were supported by the Charlatans, Kula Shaker, Manic Street Preachers, the Bootleg Beatles, the Chemical Brothers, Ocean Colour Scene and the Prodigy, played two shows with an audience of 125,000 per night.
- In 2003, Robbie Williams headlined at the main stage in Knebworth over a three-day period, drawing crowds of over 375,000, and a further 3.5 million who watched live on television and online. Other acts to perform on the same stage were the Darkness, Ash, Moby, Basement Jaxx and Kelly Osbourne. This concert caused a huge traffic jam on the A1(M) as thousands of cars tried to reach the venue during Friday evening rush hour. A subsequent album, entitled Robbie Williams – Live at Knebworth, was released, and reached number two in the UK charts. A DVD entitled What We Did Last Summer, was released afterwards.
- In 2009, Metallica and Linkin Park headlined the first ever UK Sonisphere Festival. Other bands included Nine Inch Nails, Heaven & Hell, and Avenged Sevenfold, whose late drummer The Rev would play his final show during the festival. The festival took place again in 2010 with Rammstein and Iron Maiden headlining plus performances from other acts such as Alice Cooper, Iggy and the Stooges and Mötley Crüe.

== Concert history ==
Name	Date(s)	Artists	Attendance (approx.)	Ref.
The Bucolic Frolic	20 July 1974	The Allman Brothers Band, the Doobie Brothers, Mahavishnu Orchestra, the Sensational Alex Harvey Band, Van Morrison, Tim Buckley	60,000	
Knebworth Festival 1975	5 July 1975	Pink Floyd, Captain Beefheart, Linda Lewis, Monty Python, Steve Miller Band, Roy Harper	100,000	
Knebworth Fair 1976	21 August 1976	10cc, Hot Tuna, Lynyrd Skynyrd, Don Harrison Band, the Rolling Stones, Todd Rundgren	120,000	
A Midsummer Night's Dream 1978	24 June 1978	Atlanta Rhythm Section, Brand X, Devo, Genesis, Jefferson Starship, Tom Petty and the Heartbreakers, Roy Harper	60,000	
Oh God Not Another Boring Old Knebworth! 1978	9 September 1978	Dave Edmunds, Frank Zappa, Nick Lowe, Peter Gabriel, the Boomtown Rats, The Tubes, Wilko Johnson's Solid Senders	45,000	
Knebworth Festival 1979	4 August 1979	Chas & Dave, Commander Cody, Fairport Convention, Led Zeppelin, the Marshall Tucker Band, Southside Johnny, Todd Rundgren	109,000	
Knebworth Festival 1979	11 August 1979	Chas & Dave, Commander Cody, Led Zeppelin, the New Barbarians, the Marshall Tucker Band, Southside Johnny, Todd Rundgren	60,000	
Knebworth Festival 1980	21 June 1980	Elkie Brooks, Lindisfarne, Mike Oldfield, the Beach Boys, the Blues Band, Santana	45,000	
Capital Jazz Festival 1981	15 June 1981	Benny Goodman; Chuck Berry; Ella Fitzgerald; Lionel Hampton's Big Band (without Hampton, who was ill); Muddy Waters; Sarah Vaughan; Barbara Thompson's Paraphernalia; Arnett Cobb, Wallace Davenport and Ricky Ford; Illinois Jacquet; Art Pepper; Eddie Vinson; Buddy DeFranco and Terry Gibbs; Dexter Gordon	50,000	
Capital Jazz Festival 1982	16 July 1982	Pizza Express All Stars, NYJO, Zoot Money, Bobby Lamb–Ray Premru Band, the Ronnie Scott Quintet, Nucleus, Shakatak, Morrissey–Mullen, the Breakfast Band, Carmen McRae		
Capital Jazz Festival 1982	17 July 1982	B. B. King, Jimmy Cliff, the Jazztet, Jay McShann, Tal Farlow		
Capital Jazz Festival 1982	18 July 1982	The Crusaders, Spyro Gyra, Chico Freeman, Dick Hyman, Dizzy Gillespie		
Capital Jazz Festival 1982	24 July 1982	Ray Charles, Gerry Mulligan's Big Band, Clark Terry, Freddie Hubbard–Ron Carter, Modern Jazz Quartet		
Capital Jazz Festival 1982	25 July 1982	Wynton Marsalis, Lionel Hampton's Big Band, Steps Ahead, Dave Brubeck (with Chris Brubeck and Jerry Bergonzi), Great Guitars		
Greenbelt Festival 1982	August 1982	Adrian Snell, Andy Pratt, Positive Earth, Bryn Haworth, Calvin Seerveld, Jim Wallis, Noel Paul Stookey, Paradise, Patrick Sookhdeo, Maxine and the Majestics, Rez Band, Roger Forster, Servant, Talking Drums, the Barratt Band		
Greenbelt Festival 1983	August 1983	100% Proof, Cliff Richard, Jessy Dixon, Mighty Clouds of Joy, Sheila Walsh		
The Return of the Knebworth Fayre 1985	22 June 1985	Alaska, Blackfoot, Deep Purple, Mama's Boys, Meat Loaf, Mountain, Scorpions, UFO	80,000	
A Night of Summer Magic 1986	9 August 1986	Queen, Big Country, Status Quo, Belouis Some	120,000	
The Silver Clef Award Winners Concert 1990	30 June 1990	Cliff Richard & the Shadows, Genesis, Dire Straits, Elton John, Eric Clapton, Phil Collins, Paul McCartney, Pink Floyd, Robert Plant & Jimmy Page, Status Quo, Tears for Fears	120,000	
Knebworth Festival 1992	2 August 1992	Genesis, Lisa Stansfield, the Saw Doctors	90,000	
Knebworth Festival 1996	10 August 1996	Oasis, Ocean Colour Scene, Manic Street Preachers, the Bootleg Beatles, the Chemical Brothers, the Prodigy	125,000	
Knebworth Festival 1996	11 August 1996	Oasis, Cast, Dreadzone, Kula Shaker, Manic Street Preachers, the Charlatans	125,000	
Ministry @Knebworth 2001	11 August 2001	Bent, Jamiroquai, Lo Fidelity Allstars	35,000	
Robbie Williams Live at Knebworth	1 August 2003	Robbie Williams, Ash, Kelly Osbourne, Basement Jaxx, Moby, the Darkness	125,000	
Robbie Williams Live at Knebworth	2 August 2003	Robbie Williams, Ash, Kelly Osbourne, Basement Jaxx, Moby, the Darkness	125,000	
Robbie Williams Live at Knebworth	3 August 2003	Robbie Williams, Ash, Kelly Osbourne, Basement Jaxx, Moby, the Darkness	125,000	
Wild in the Country 2007	30 June 2007	2ManyDJs, Erol Alkan, Hot Chip, Justice, Sasha & John Digweed, Simian Mobile Disco, Tiga, Underworld		
Sonisphere Festival 2009	1 August 2009	Airbourne, Alien Ant Farm, Anthrax, Björn Again, Bullet for My Valentine, Heaven & Hell, Linkin Park, Skindred, Soil, Taking Back Sunday, the Used	55,000	
Sonisphere Festival 2009	2 August 2009	Alice in Chains, Avenged Sevenfold, Buckcherry, Feeder, Killing Joke, Lamb of God, Limp Bizkit, Machine Head, Mastodon, Metallica, Nine Inch Nails, Paradise Lost, Saxon	55,000	
Sonisphere Festival 2010	30 July 2010	65daysofstatic, Alice Cooper, Delain, Europe, Gary Numan, Terrorvision, Turisas	55,000	
Sonisphere Festival 2010	31 July 2010	Anthrax, Apocalyptica, Corey Taylor, Family Force 5, Fear Factory, Gallows, Lacuna Coil, Mötley Crüe, Papa Roach, Placebo, Rammstein, Sabaton, Skunk Anansie, Soulfly, Therapy?	55,000	
Sonisphere Festival 2010	1 August 2010	Alice in Chains, Bring Me the Horizon, CKY, The Cult, Dir En Grey, Fightstar, Funeral for a Friend, Henry Rollins, Iggy & The Stooges, Iron Maiden, Madina Lake, Pendulum, Skindred, Slayer	55,000	
Sonisphere Festival 2011	8 July 2011	Anthrax, Diamond Head, Megadeth, Metallica, Slayer		
Sonisphere Festival 2011	9 July 2011	Architects, Bad Religion, Biffy Clyro, Cavalera Conspiracy, Sylosis, You Me At Six, Weezer		
Sonisphere Festival 2011	10 July 2011	Arch Enemy, Limp Bizkit, Mastodon, Motörhead, Parkway Drive, Slipknot, Volbeat		
The Red Hot Chili Peppers	23 June 2012	The Red Hot Chili Peppers, Dizzee Rascal, the Wombats, Reverend and the Makers	80,000	
Eastern Electronics	August 2013 (2–4)	Hot Natured, Moderat, Âme, Anja Schneider, Ata, Ben UFO, Blawan, Catz N Dogz, Chris Liebing, Claude VonStroke, the Climbers, Clockwork, Damian Lazarus, Dave Clarke, Deetron, Dixon, DJ Sneak, DJ Tennis, Droog, Dyed Soundorom, Eats Everything, Ellen Allien, Felix Dickinson, Francesca Lombardo, Futureboogie DJs, Gavin Herlihy, Geddes, Giles Smith, Guy Gerber, Heidi, Huxley, Infinity Ink, James Priestley, Josh Wink, Joy Orbison, Jozif, Justin Martin, DJ Koze, Krankbrother, Laura Jones, Levon Vincent, Luca Pilato, Maceo Plex, Magda, Masters at Work, Matthias Tanzmann, Maurice Fulton, Maxxi Soundsystem, Maya Jane Coles, Michael Mayer, Miguel Campbell, MK, Nick Curly, No Artificial Colours, Pan-Pot, PBR Streetgang, Prosumer, Ralph Lawson, Raresh, Richy Ahmed, Robert James, Roman Flügel, Ryan Crosson, Sasha, Seth Troxler, Shadow Child, Luke Slater, Soul Bros, Subb-an, Tama Sumo, Theo Parrish, Tommy Four Seven, Waifs and Strays	12,000	
Sonisphere Festival 2014	July 2014 (4–6)	Metallica, Iron Maiden, the Prodigy, Dream Theater, Slayer, Alice in Chains, Deftones, Limp Bizkit, Watain, Mastodon, Band of Skulls, Frank Turner, Babymetal, Dropkick Murphys, Chas & Dave, Glass City Vice, The Sisters of Mercy	55,000	
Knebworth Festival 2022	3 June 2022	Abbie McCarthy, Pastel, Amyl and the Sniffers, Paolo Nutini, Kasabian, Liam Gallagher	100,000	
Knebworth Festival 2022	4 June 2022	Jack Saunders, Goat Girl, Fat White Family, Michael Kiwanuka, Kasabian, Liam Gallagher	100,000	
Eddfest 2026	July 2026 (10–11)	Iron Maiden, the Darkness, The Hu, Airbourne, The Almighty, Blaze Bayley (Iron Maiden songs), Maiden United, Airforce, Stray, Tony Moore Awaking	125,000	
Oasis Live '27	September 2027 (11–12, 18–19, 25–26)	Oasis, Richard Ashcroft		

== Bibliography ==
- Blake, Mark (2016). Freddie Mercury: A Kind of Magic. Omnibus Press.
