= Hamish Hamilton (director) =

British director (born 1966)

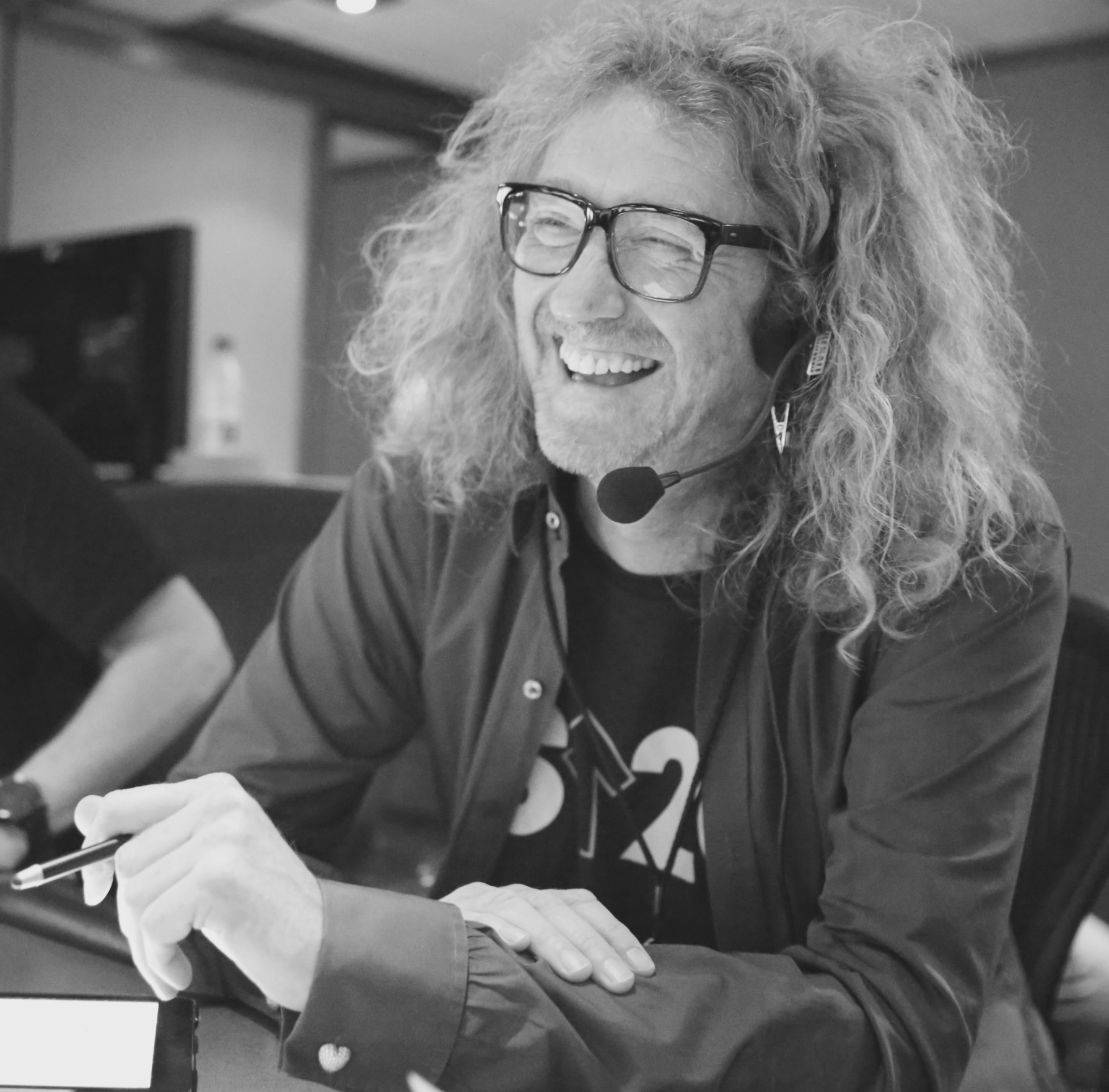
- Born: Mark Hamilton; 8 April 1966 (age 60); Blackpool, England
- Years active: 1989–present
- Known for: Music video and television director
- Awards: British Academy Television Craft Awards (2013)

Hamish Hamilton (born Mark Hamilton; 8 April 1966) is a British director. He has directed the Super Bowl halftime show annually since 2010. He has also directed the Academy Awards and the MTV Video Music Awards, and worked with music artists such as Mariah Carey, Eminem, Madonna, The Who and U2. He was the Executive producer for broadcast for the filming of the opening and closing ceremonies for the 2012 Summer Olympics.

== Life and career ==
Hamilton was born in Blackpool, England. His career began at BBC Scotland, where he was trained as a producer and director. His early work included a stint directing the acclaimed BBC travel series Rough Guide to the World. Whilst at BBC Manchester he began directing studio-based entertainment shows, including The Sunday Show. Hamilton is also a partner in global televised live event production company Done + Dusted.

In February 2010, after 15 years directing prominent multicamera-based television and DVD projects he directed the 82nd Annual Academy Awards and the Super Bowl halftime show. He has directed live concert DVDs for U2, Beyoncé, Robbie Williams, Britney Spears, The Rolling Stones, Peter Gabriel, Justin Timberlake, Madonna, Jennifer Lopez, Christina Aguilera, Bryan Adams, Avril Lavigne, Mötley Crüe and Phil Collins. His award show credits include the MTV Video Music Awards, MTV Europe Music Awards, and Victoria's Secret Fashion Shows between 2003 and 2015.

In 2012, Hamilton directed the televising of the opening and closing ceremonies for the London 2012 Olympic and Paralympic Games. He was the broadcast director for the 2022 Commonwealth Games opening ceremony in Birmingham. He has also directed every Super Bowl halftime show since 2010, as well as the 2026 FIFA World Cup final halftime show.

He was awarded the BAFTA Special Award at the British Academy Television Craft Awards on 28 April 2013. Hamilton won a second BAFTA for Multi-Camera Directing the London Olympic Opening Ceremonies, and was nominated for an Emmy. He received an honorary doctorate from the University of Stirling in June 2019.

== Selected videography ==
- MTV Europe – X-Ray Vision (1996)
- Beastie Boys – Live in Glasgow (1999)
- Rammstein – Live aus Berlin (1999)
- Melanie C – Northern Star (1999) (documentary)
- Spice Girls – In Concert! (2000)
- Blur - The Singles Night: Live in Wembley (2000)
- Bryan Adams – Live at Slane Castle, Ireland (2001)
- U2 – Elevation 2001: Live from Boston (2001)
- Kylie Minogue – Live in Sydney (2001)
- Madonna – Drowned World Tour 2001 (2001)
- U2 – U2 Go Home: Live from Slane Castle, Ireland (2003)
- Jay-Z – In Concert (2003)
- Robbie Williams – Live at Knebworth / What We Did Last Summer (2003)
- Peter Gabriel – Growing Up Live (2003)
- Phil Collins – Finally... The First Farewell Tour (2004)
- Madonna – Re-Invention World Tour: Get Up Lisbon! (2004) (un-broadcast)
- Britney Spears – Britney Spears Live from Miami (2004)
- Eminem – Live from New York City (2005)
- Simply Red – Recorded Live at El Gran Teatro, Havana (2005)
- U2 – Vertigo 2005: Live from Chicago
- U2 – Vertigo 05: Live from Milan (2006)
- Coldplay - How We Saw the World (Part One) (2006)
- Rammstein – Völkerball (2006)
- The Rolling Stones – The Biggest Bang (2007)
- Christina Aguilera – Back to Basics: Live and Down Under (2008)
- Josh Groban – Awake Live (2008)
- Neil Diamond – Hot August Night/NYC: Live from Madison Square Garden (2009)
- The Who – Super Bowl XLIV halftime show (2010)
- Academy of Motion Picture Arts and Sciences – 82nd Academy Awards (2010)
- Madonna – Super Bowl XLVI halftime show (2012)
- London 2012 Olympic and Paralympic Games – opening and closing ceremonies (2012)
- Beyoncé – Super Bowl XLVII halftime show (2013)
- Bruno Mars – Super Bowl XLVIII halftime show (2014)
- Academy of Motion Picture Arts and Sciences – 86th Academy Awards (2014)
- Katy Perry – Super Bowl XLIX halftime show (2015)
- Academy of Motion Picture Arts and Sciences – 87th Academy Awards (2015)
- U2 – Innocence + Experience: Live in Paris (2015)
- Coldplay – Super Bowl 50 halftime show (2016)
- Beyoncé – The Formation World Tour (2016)
- Alicia Keys – Here in Times Square (2016)
- Lady Gaga – Super Bowl LI halftime show (2017)
- Ariana Grande – One Love Manchester (2017)
- Justin Timberlake – Super Bowl LII halftime show (2018)
- Academy of Television Arts and Sciences – 70th Primetime Emmy Awards (2018)
- The Carters – OTR II (2018)
- Maroon 5 – Super Bowl LIII halftime show (2019)
- Academy of Television Arts and Sciences – 71st Primetime Emmy Awards (2019)
- Jennifer Lopez, Shakira – Super Bowl LIV halftime show (2020)
- ABC – The Disney Family Singalong (2020)
- Academy of Television Arts and Sciences – 72nd Primetime Emmy Awards (2020)
- The Weeknd – Super Bowl LV halftime show (2021)
- Academy of Television Arts and Sciences – 73rd Primetime Emmy Awards (2021)
- Dr. Dre, Snoop Dogg, Eminem, Mary J. Blige, Kendrick Lamar – Super Bowl LVI halftime show (2022)
- Academy of Television Arts and Sciences – 74th Primetime Emmy Awards (2022)
- Academy of Motion Picture Arts and Sciences – 96th Academy Awards (2024)
- Kendrick Lamar, SZA, Mustard, Samuel L. Jackson, Serena Williams - Super Bowl LIX halftime show (2025)
