= Live at Knebworth =

Live album by Robbie Williams
- Released: 29 September 2003
- Recorded: 1–3 August 2003, Knebworth Park, England
- Length: 72:37
- Label: EMI

Robbie Williams chronology
Escapology (2002)	Live at Knebworth (2003)	Greatest Hits (2004)

Professional ratings
Review scores
Source	Rating
AllMusic	2.5/5 stars

Live at Knebworth, also known as Live Summer 2003, is a live album by English pop singer Robbie Williams, recorded and released in 2003. The album is his first live album, and is a compilation of songs performed during three consecutive shows at Knebworth Park, England on 1–3 August 2003.

The three shows attracted a total of 375,000 fans, becoming the "biggest music event in British history". It is the second fastest and biggest selling live album ever in the United Kingdom behind Williams' former band Take That's live album The Greatest Day – Take That Present: The Circus Live. It has been certified 2× Platinum by the IFPI for sales over 2 million copies.

The DVD released of that Summer's three performances at Knebworth Park was titled What We Did Last Summer, a reference to the film I Know What You Did Last Summer. It went on to sell 350,000 in the United Kingdom. In Australia, the DVD went on to sell 165,000 copies, 25,000 more than the actual album.

For the final show, Williams' former Take That bandmate Mark Owen was invited to perform "Back for Good" on stage with him at Knebworth. This was the first time the two had performed together since the band split in 1996. After performing with Williams, Owen returned to the spotlight, signing a deal with Island/Universal Records.

== Track listing ==
1. "Let Me Entertain You" – 5:54
2. "Let Love Be Your Energy" – 4:46
3. "We Will Rock You" – 1:18
4. "Monsoon" – 5:11
5. "Come Undone" – 5:34
6. "Me and My Monkey" – 7:20
7. "Hot Fudge" – 5:44
8. "Mr. Bojangles" – 5:26
9. "She's the One" – 5:43
10. "Kids" – 7:22
11. "Better Man" – 2:12
12. "Nan's Song" – 4:50
13. "Feel" – 5:16
14. "Angels" – 5:56

=== Pregaps ===
Between-song banter and various mini-songs can be found between some of the songs on the album in pregaps:

- Robbie Williams talking to the audience (0:41, between tracks 4 and 5)
- Robbie Williams talking to the audience (0:37, between tracks 5 and 6)
- Robbie Williams introducing "Hot Fudge" (0:06, between tracks 6 and 7)
- Robbie Williams introducing Max Beesley whilst singing a little song about him (1:35, between tracks 7 and 8)
- Robbie Williams talking to Max Beesley whilst Beesley plays a song on piano (1:21, between tracks 8 & 9)
- Robbie Williams talking to the audience (1:20, between tracks 9 and 10)
- Robbie Williams singing a song about Knebworth and his mother (1:10, between tracks 10 and 11)
- Robbie Williams introducing "Nan's Song" (0:18, between tracks 11 and 12)
- Robbie Williams introducing "Feel" (1:31, between tracks 12 and 13)
- Robbie Williams introducing "Angels" (0:44, between tracks 13 and 14)

== Singles ==
In Mexico and Argentina, EMI Music sent a promotional CD to radio stations featuring "Feel" and "Angels" live from the show.

== Personnel ==
- Max Beesley: percussion, piano
- Dave Bishop: flute, saxophone
- Yolanda Charles: bass guitar
- Melvin Duffy: slide guitar
- Simon Gardner: trumpet
- Katie Kissoon: background vocals
- Tessa Niles: background vocals
- Gary Nuttall: guitar, background vocals
- Mark Plati: guitar, keyboards, background vocals
- Chris Sharrock: drums
- J. Neil Sidwell: trombone
- Steve Sidwell: trumpet
- Paul Spong: trumpet
- Neil Taylor: guitar, background vocals
- Chris White: flute, saxophone
- Robbie Williams: vocals, guitar
- Claire Worrall: keyboards, guitar, background vocals

== Charts ==
=== Weekly charts ===
Weekly chart performance for Live at Knebworth
Chart (2003–2006)	Peak position
Argentine Albums (CAPIF)	11
Australian Albums (ARIA)	3
Austrian Albums (Ö3 Austria)	1
Belgian Albums (Ultratop Flanders)	5
Belgian Albums (Ultratop Wallonia)	15
Danish Albums (Hitlisten)	1
Dutch Albums (Album Top 100)	3
European Albums Chart	2
Finnish Albums (Suomen virallinen lista)	10
French Albums (SNEP)	12
German Albums (Offizielle Top 100)	1
Hungarian Albums (MAHASZ)	10
Irish Albums (IRMA)	2
Italian Albums (FIMI)	4
Italian Albums (Musica e dischi)	3
New Zealand Albums (RMNZ)	6
Norwegian Albums (VG-lista)	1
Polish Albums (ZPAV)	21
Portuguese Albums (AFP)	1
Spanish Albums (PROMUSICAE)	13
Swedish Albums (Sverigetopplistan)	7
Swiss Albums (Schweizer Hitparade)	2
UK Albums (Official Charts)	2

=== Year-end charts ===
2003 year-end chart performance for Live at Knebworth
Chart (2003)	Position
Australian Albums (ARIA)	28
Austrian Albums (Ö3 Austria)	5
Belgian Albums (Ultratop Flanders)	37
Dutch Albums (Album Top 100)	12
German Albums (Offizielle Top 100)	8
Swedish Albums (Sverigetopplistan)	45
Swiss Albums (Schweizer Hitparade)	7
UK Albums (OCC)	30
Worldwide Albums (IFPI)	37

2004 year-end chart performance for Live at Knebworth
Chart (2004)	Position
Australian Albums (ARIA)	46
Austrian Albums (Ö3 Austria)	26
Belgian Albums (Ultratop Flanders)	93
Dutch Albums (Album Top 100)	43
German Albums (Offizielle Top 100)	9
Swiss Albums (Schweizer Hitparade)	71

== Certifications ==
Certifications and sales for Live at Knebworth
Region	Certification	Certified units/sales
Argentina (CAPIF)	3× Platinum	120,000^{^}
Australia (ARIA)	3× Platinum	210,000^{^}
Austria (IFPI Austria)	2× Platinum	60,000^{*}
Belgium (BRMA)	Gold	25,000^{*}
Denmark (IFPI Danmark)	Platinum	40,000^{^}
Finland (Musiikkituottajat)	Gold	15,303
France (SNEP)	Gold	100,000^{*}
Germany (BVMI)	9× Gold	900,000^{^}
Hungary (MAHASZ)	Gold	10,000^{^}
Netherlands (NVPI)	Gold	40,000^{^}
New Zealand (RMNZ)	Platinum	15,000^{^}
Portugal (AFP)	2× Platinum	80,000^{^}
South Korea	—	4,057
Spain (Promusicae)	Gold	50,000^{^}
Sweden (GLF)	Gold	30,000^{^}
Switzerland (IFPI Switzerland)	2× Platinum	80,000^{^}
United Kingdom (BPI)	2× Platinum	634,197
Summaries
Europe (IFPI)	2× Platinum	2,000,000^{*}
^{*} Sales figures based on certification alone.^{^} Shipments figures based on certification alone.

== Concert track listing ==
The album was recorded in three evenings in Knebworth and then cut. The set lists for the three performances were:

=== Set lists ===
Track	Evening 1	Evening 2	Evening 3
1	"Let Me Entertain You"	"Let Me Entertain You"	"Let Me Entertain You"
2	"Let Love Be Your Energy"	"Let Love Be Your Energy"	"Let Love Be Your Energy"
3	"We Will Rock You"	"Monsoon"	"We Will Rock You"
4	"Monsoon"	"Come Undone"	"Monsoon"
5	"Come Undone"	"Strong"	"Come Undone"
6	"Strong"	"Me and My Monkey"	"Strong"
7	"Me and My Monkey"	"Hot Fudge"	"Me and My Monkey"
8	"Hot Fudge"	"Mr. Bojangles"	"Hot Fudge"
9	"Mr. Bojangles"	"Supreme"	"Mr. Bojangles"
10	"She's the One"	"Better Man"	"She's the One"
11	"Supreme"	"Nan's Song"	"Supreme"
12	"No Regrets"	"Feel"	"Kids"
13	"Kids"	"Rock DJ"	"Back for Good" (with Mark Owen)
14	"Better Man"	"Angels"	"Better Man"
15	"Nan's Song"	"Back for Good"	"Nan's Song"
16	"Feel"	-	"Feel"
17	"Rock DJ"	-	"Rock DJ"
18	"Angels"	-	"Millennium"
19	"Back for Good"	-	"Angels"
