= Close Encounters of the Third Kind and Other Great Space Music =

"Close Encounters of The Third Kind and Other Great Space Music"

Soundtrack album by National Philharmonic Orchestra
- Released: 1978
- Label: Stereo Gold Award Recordings
- Producer: Paul Fishman

Close Encounters of the Third Kind and Other Great Space Music is an LP record album from 1978, originally published under the "Stereo Gold Award Recordings" Label.

== The album ==
The recording features a suite of symphonic music composed by John Williams for Steven Spielberg's motion picture Close Encounters of The Third Kind (1977). This studio album was performed by the National Philharmonic Orchestra and Chorale, and it was recorded at the defunct CTS studios, in London, England. As was the standard practice of the time, the producer of the album paid for Williams's orchestrations as well for as the session orchestra for this album. Williams was not present at its recording.

The album also includes several musical compositions not associated with any film, but rather reflecting a "space theme". These selections were written by an assortment of composers (not Williams), and their styles vary from orchestral – "Orion" – to ambient – "P.O.B. 734" and "Sky Ride". The music featured the contemporary synthesized sound of the time.

The composers who are credited were A. Bunny, Paul Fishman, and J. Johnson. The orchestral sessions were conducted by Frank Barber. This record album was produced by Paul Fishman, and its sound engineering was done by Richard Goldblatt.

== Track listing ==
Composer in parentheses

1. "Introduction to Close Encounters" (A. Bunny)
2. "The Five Tones and Mountain Visions" (John Williams)
3. "John William's Symphonic Suite of Close Encounters of the Third Kind" (John Williams)
4. "Sky Ride" (A. Bunny)
5. "P.O.B. 734" (Paul Fishman)
6. "Orion" (J. Johnson)
7. "Aeromancy" (Paul Fishman)

== Additional information ==
- Label: Stereo Gold Award Recordings
- Damont Records
- Catalogue No. Mer 440
