= Advertising Space =

2005 single by Robbie Williams

Single by Robbie Williams

from the album Intensive Care
- Released: 12 December 2005
- Recorded: June 2003–May 2005
- Studio: AIR, The Townhouse (London, England); Rockband East and West; Henson (Los Angeles)
- Length: 4:37
- Label: Chrysalis
- Songwriters: Robbie Williams; Stephen Duffy
- Producers: Stephen Duffy; Robbie Williams

Robbie Williams singles chronology
"Make Me Pure" (2005)	"Advertising Space" (2005)	"Sin Sin Sin" (2006)

Music video
- "Advertising Space" on YouTube

"Advertising Space" is a song by British singer Robbie Williams, for his sixth studio album, Intensive Care (2005). It was released as the third single from the album on 12 December 2005 and reached number eight on the UK Singles Chart. In the song's music video, largely filmed in a room above the Belle Vue pub in Blackpool in the United Kingdom, Williams emulates Elvis in movement, appearance, and habits.

== Background ==
Inspired by True Romance, where Christian Slater's character spoke to the spirit of Elvis Presley, Williams wrote a ballad about "a superstar's fall from grace", which Williams jokingly called his "Candle in the Wind". While interviewed on Parkinson and asked about the title "Advertising Space", Williams stated that he gave particular focus to how after dying Elvis was reduced to merchandising, or remembering "the joke part of his life, the end bit when he got big".

== Track listings ==
UK CD1 and Australian CD single

1. "Advertising Space"
2. "Family Coach"

UK CD2

1. "Advertising Space"
2. "Twist"
3. "Don't Say No"
4. Gallery (U-MYX)

UK DVD single

1. "Advertising Space" (video)
2. "Don't Say No" (audio)
3. "Overture for Berlin" (audio)

== Credits and personnel ==
Credits are taken from the Intensive Care album booklet.

Studios

- Recorded between June 2003 and May 2005 at AIR Studios, The Townhouse (London, England), Rockband East and West, and Henson Studios (Los Angeles)
- Mixed at Mix This! (Pacific Palisades, Los Angeles)
- Strings engineered at NRG (North Hollywood, California)
- Mastered at Metropolis Mastering (London, England)

Personnel

- Robbie Williams – writing, lead vocals, production
- Stephen Duffy – writing, Fender Mustang guitar, Martin acoustic guitar, Ethereal Electronic Korg keyboards, production
- Claire Worrall – backing vocals, Bösendorfer piano
- Jerry Meehan – Fender Precision Bass guitar
- Greg Leisz – lap and pedal steel guitars
- Jebin Bruni – Prophet-5
- Matt Chamberlain – drums, percussion
- David Campbell – string arrangement, conducting
- Allen Sides – string engineering
- Bob Clearmountain – mixing
- Tony Cousins – mastering

== Charts ==
=== Weekly charts ===
Chart (2005–2006)	Peak position
Australia (ARIA)	17
Austria (Ö3 Austria Top 40)	8
Belgium (Ultratop 50 Flanders)	19
Belgium (Ultratop 50 Wallonia)	13
Czech Republic Airplay (ČNS IFPI)	4
Denmark (Tracklisten)	7
Europe (Eurochart Hot 100)	15
Europe (European Hit Radio)	1
Finland Airplay (Radiosoittolista)	8
France (SNEP)	14
Germany (GfK)	10
Germany Airplay (BVMI)	1
Hungary (Rádiós Top 40)	35
Ireland (IRMA)	20
Italy (FIMI)	4
Italy (Musica e dischi)	3
Latvia (Latvijas Top 50)	35
Netherlands (Dutch Top 40)	5
Netherlands (Single Top 100)	12
New Zealand (Recorded Music NZ)	32
Romania (Romanian Top 100)	34
Scottish Singles Sales (Official Charts)	9
Spain (Promusicae)	11
Spain Airplay (Top 40 Radio)	8
Switzerland (Schweizer Hitparade)	9
Sweden (Sverigetopplistan)	11
UK Singles (Official Charts)	8
UK Airplay (Music Week)	3

=== Year-end charts ===
Chart (2005)	Position
UK Singles (OCC)	194

Chart (2006)	Position
Austria (Ö3 Austria Top 40)	55
Belgium (Ultratop 50 Wallonia)	84
Europe (Eurochart Hot 100)	45
France (SNEP)	84
France Airplay (SNEP)	37
Germany (Media Control GfK)	60
Italy (FIMI)	47
Netherlands (Dutch Top 40)	58
Switzerland (Schweizer Hitparade)	54
UK Airplay (Music Week)	50

== Release history ==
Region	Date	Format(s)	Label(s)	Ref.
Australia	12 December 2005	CD	Chrysalis	
United Kingdom	12 December 2005	CD	Chrysalis	
