= Tripping (song) =

2005 single by Robbie Williams

Single by Robbie Williams

from the album Intensive Care
- B-side: "Make Me Pure" (edit); "Meet the Stars"
- Released: 3 October 2005
- Recorded: June 2003–May 2005
- Studio: AIR, The Townhouse (London, England); Rockband East and West; Henson (Los Angeles)
- Genre: Pop; ska
- Length: 4:36 (album version); 4:03 (radio edit)
- Label: Chrysalis
- Songwriters: Robbie Williams; Stephen Duffy
- Producers: Stephen Duffy; Robbie Williams

Robbie Williams singles chronology
| "Misunderstood" (2004) | "Tripping" (2005) | "Make Me Pure" (2005) |

Music video
- "Tripping" on YouTube

"Tripping" is a song by British singer Robbie Williams from his sixth studio album Intensive Care (2005). The single was released as the album's lead single on 3 October 2005 through Chrysalis Records. Backed with the track "Make Me Pure", also from the same album, it was sent to radio stations around the world.

Upon its release, "Tripping" became a global hit, reaching number one in Germany, Italy, and the Netherlands. It peaked within the top five in more than 10 European countries, including the United Kingdom, where it reached number two and was the 19th best-selling single of 2005. It was also a success in Australia, reaching number seven on the ARIA Singles Chart, and peaked at number 20 in New Zealand.

== Background and composition ==
Robbie Williams called the song "something like a mini gangster opera" and "kind of cabaret act reggae". The rolling rhythm of the song owes much to the early work of the Clash. During the chorus Williams reaches an extremely high disco-like head voice. Lyrically the song is a bit darker than previous songs. It tells the tale of gangsters and how they "don't kill their own and they all love their mothers", before an anguished chorus of "I've taken as much as I'm willing to take". The opening lyrics "First they ignore you, then laugh at you and hate you. Then they fight you, then you win" is a paraphrase commonly misattributed to Mahatma Gandhi.

== Chart performance ==
The song became a worldwide success for Williams, debuting inside the top 10 in most countries around Europe, including number two in the United Kingdom, spending six weeks inside the top 10 and 15 weeks inside the top 75. The single reached number one in Germany, Italy, and the Netherlands. The song also reached number one on the Eurochart Hot 100, becoming Europe's eighth-most-successful song of 2005. In Switzerland, the single was certified Gold for shipments exceeding 20,000 units. In Mexico, the song reached number nine and became the 11th most played track of the year. In Australia, "Tripping" peaked at number seven and went on to sell over 35,000 copies, being certified Gold by the Australian Recording Industry Association.

== Music video ==
The video, which was directed by Johan Renck, features Robbie Williams running in place as if he can't seem to get anywhere. It appears that Williams is having a nightmare, in which he is living sometime in the 1950s, and is stuck running endlessly in a maze without ever advancing, or driving in a stereotypical 1950s backdrop. It also includes a baby singing to him some of the chorus, and a pair of lesbian twins in the backseat of his Saab 95. He finds himself trapped in an elevator with a larger person dressed in drag, who unexpectedly suggests engaging in intimate actions. Initially, he attempts to resist, but eventually succumbs to the situation and allows the person to touch him. Right at that moment, Williams awakens, smiles, and gently closes his eyes.

== Track listings ==
UK CD1 and European CD single

1. "Tripping" (album version)
2. "Make Me Pure" (edit)

UK CD2

1. "Tripping" (album version)
2. "Make Me Pure" (edit)
3. "Meet the Stars"
4. "Tripping" (video)
5. Picture gallery

UK DVD single

1. "Tripping" (video)
2. "Make Me Pure" (video)
3. "Bag Full of Silly" (audio)
4. Video clip and photo gallery

Australian CD single

1. "Tripping" (album version)
2. "Make Me Pure" (edit)
3. "Meet the Stars"

== Credits and personnel ==
Credits are taken from the Intensive Care album booklet.

Studios

- Recorded between June 2003 and May 2005 at AIR Studios, The Townhouse (London, England), Rockband East and West, and Henson Studios (Los Angeles)
- Mixed at Mix This! (Pacific Palisades, Los Angeles)
- Strings engineered at NRG (North Hollywood, California)
- Mastered at Metropolis Mastering (London, England)

Personnel

- Robbie Williams – writing, lead vocals, backing vocals, Fender Jazz Bass guitar, production
- Stephen Duffy – writing, Fender Stratocaster guitar, Korg keyboard, Hobner melodica, glockenspiel, production
- Claire Worrall – backing vocals, Wurlitzer
- Jerry Meehan – Fender Precision Bass guitar
- Matt Chamberlain – drums
- Max Beesley – percussion, vibes, Waldorf synthesiser
- Steve Sidwell – trumpet
- Neil Sidwell – trombone
- Dave Bishop – saxophone
- David Campbell – string arrangement, conducting
- Allen Sides – string engineering
- Bob Clearmountain – mixing
- Tony Cousins – mastering

== Charts ==
=== Weekly charts ===
| Chart (2005–2006) | Peak position |
|---|---|
| Australia (ARIA) | 7 |
| Austria (Ö3 Austria Top 40) | 2 |
| Belgium (Ultratop 50 Flanders) | 8 |
| Belgium (Ultratop 50 Wallonia) | 11 |
| CIS Airplay (TopHit) | 36 |
| Czech Republic Airplay (ČNS IFPI) | 3 |
| Denmark (Tracklisten) | 3 |
| Europe (Eurochart Hot 100) | 1 |
| Europe (European Hit Radio) | 1 |
| Finland (Suomen virallinen lista) | 4 |
| Finland Airplay (Radiosoittolista) | 4 |
| France (SNEP) | 9 |
| Germany (GfK) | 1 |
| Greece (IFPI) | 12 |
| Hungary (Rádiós Top 40) | 3 |
| Hungary (Dance Top 40) | 23 |
| Hungary (Single Top 40) | 2 |
| Ireland (IRMA) | 4 |
| Italy (FIMI) | 1 |
| Italy (Musica e dischi) | 3 |
| Latvia (Latvijas Top 50) | 4 |
| Netherlands (Dutch Top 40) | 1 |
| Netherlands (Single Top 100) | 2 |
| New Zealand (Recorded Music NZ) | 20 |
| Norway (VG-lista) | 2 |
| Russia Airplay (TopHit) | 34 |
| Scottish Singles Sales (Official Charts) | 2 |
| Spain (Promusicae) | 2 |
| Spain Airplay (Top 40 Radio) | 1 |
| Sweden (Sverigetopplistan) | 2 |
| Switzerland (Schweizer Hitparade) | 2 |
| Switzerland Airplay (Swiss Hitparade) | 1 |
| UK Singles (Official Charts) | 2 |
| UK Airplay (Music Week) | 1 |

=== Year-end charts ===
| Chart (2005) | Position |
|---|---|
| Australia (ARIA) | 91 |
| Austria (Ö3 Austria Top 40) | 29 |
| Belgium (Ultratop 50 Flanders) | 75 |
| Belgium (Ultratop 50 Wallonia) | 57 |
| Europe (Eurochart Hot 100) | 8 |
| France (SNEP) | 41 |
| France Airplay (SNEP) | 10 |
| Germany (Media Control GfK) | 29 |
| Hungary (Rádiós Top 40) | 44 |
| Italy (FIMI) | 15 |
| Latvia (Latvijas Top 50) | 53 |
| Netherlands (Dutch Top 40) | 10 |
| Netherlands (Single Top 100) | 10 |
| Russia Airplay (TopHit) | 133 |
| Sweden (Hitlistan) | 22 |
| Switzerland (Schweizer Hitparade) | 41 |
| UK Singles (OCC) | 19 |
| UK Airplay (Music Week) | 12 |

| Chart (2006) | Position |
|---|---|
| Europe (Eurochart Hot 100) | 75 |
| Hungary (Rádiós Top 40) | 79 |

== Certifications and sales ==
| Region | Certification | Certified units/sales |
|---|---|---|
| Australia (ARIA) | Gold | 35,000^{^} |
| Denmark (IFPI Danmark) | Gold | 4,000^{^} |
| France (SNEP) | Gold | 200,000^{*} |
| Switzerland (IFPI Switzerland) | Gold | 20,000^{^} |
| United Kingdom (BPI) | Silver | 200,000^{‡} |
^{*} Sales figures based on certification alone.^{^} Shipments figures based on certification alone.^{‡} Sales+streaming figures based on certification alone.

== Release history ==
| Region | Date | Format(s) | Label(s) | Ref. |
|---|---|---|---|---|
| Australia | 3 October 2005 | CD | Chrysalis | |
| United Kingdom | 3 October 2005 | CD | Chrysalis | |
