= Sin Sin Sin =

2006 single by Robbie Williams

- UK CD artwork

Single by Robbie Williams

from the album Intensive Care
- Released: 22 May 2006
- Recorded: June 2003–May 2005
- Studio: Air, The Townhouse (London, England); Rockband East and West; Henson (Los Angeles)
- Length: 4:09 (album version); 4:04 (single version)
- Label: Chrysalis
- Songwriters: Robbie Williams; Stephen Duffy; Chris Heath
- Producers: Stephen Duffy; Robbie Williams

Robbie Williams singles chronology
"Advertising Space" (2005)	"Sin Sin Sin" (2006)	"Rudebox" (2006)

Alternative cover
- 7-inch, DVD, and international artwork

Music video
- "Sin Sin Sin" on YouTube

"Sin Sin Sin" is a song by British singer Robbie Williams from his sixth studio album, Intensive Care (2005). It was released as the album's fourth and last single on 22 May 2006 by Chrysalis Records. The song was remixed for single release, being at a quicker tempo than the original. Additional hand claps were added throughout the song as well as some new instrumentation to the choruses. The song peaked at number 22 on the UK Singles Chart, becoming Williams' first single to miss the top 20. Elsewhere, the single reached the top 20 in Australia and several European countries, peaking at number one in Hungary.

== Music video ==
The music video was filmed by Vaughan Arnell near Cape Town, South Africa.

== Track listings ==
UK CD single

1. "Sin Sin Sin"
2. "Our Love"
3. "Sin Sin Sin" (Chris Coco's on Tour mix)
4. "Sin Sin Sin" (U-MYX software)

UK 7-inch single, European and Australian CD single

1. "Sin Sin Sin"
2. "Our Love"

UK DVD single

1. "Sin Sin Sin" (video)
2. "Our Love" (audio)
3. "Sin Sin Sin" (Chris Coco's on Tour mix audio)
4. Making of "Sin Sin Sin"
5. Photo gallery

== Credits and personnel ==
Credits are taken from the Intensive Care album booklet.

Studios

- Recorded between June 2003 and May 2005 at Air Studios, The Townhouse (London, England), Rockband East and West, and Henson Studios (Los Angeles)
- Mixed at Mix This! (Pacific Palisades, Los Angeles)
- Strings engineered at NRG (North Hollywood, California)
- Mastered at Metropolis Mastering (London, England)

Personnel

- Robbie Williams – writing, lead vocals, production
- Stephen Duffy – writing, Fender Stratocaster guitar, Martin acoustic guitar, electronic keyboards, production
- Chris Heath – writing
- Claire Worrall – backing vocals, Bösendorfer piano
- Greg Leisz – EBow guitar
- Davey Faragher – Fender Precision Bass guitar
- Jebin Bruni – Roland synthesiser
- Matt Chamberlain – drums
- David Campbell – string arrangement, conducting
- Allen Sides – string engineering
- Bob Clearmountain – mixing
- Tony Cousins – mastering

== Charts ==
=== Weekly charts ===
Chart (2006)	Peak position
Australia (ARIA)	26
Austria (Ö3 Austria Top 40)	15
Belgium (Ultratop 50 Flanders)	25
Belgium (Ultratop 50 Wallonia)	22
CIS Airplay (TopHit)	46
Czech Republic Airplay (ČNS IFPI)	9
Denmark (Tracklisten)	14
European Hot 100 Singles (Billboard)	25
Europe (European Hit Radio)	5
Finland Airplay (Radiosoittolista)	10
France (SNEP)	46
Germany (GfK)	18
Germany Airplay (BVMI)	1
Hungary (Rádiós Top 40)	1
Ireland (IRMA)	23
Italy (FIMI)	9
Italy (Musica e dischi)	10
Latvia (Latvijas Top 50)	9
Netherlands (Dutch Top 40)	9
Netherlands (Single Top 100)	13
New Zealand (Recorded Music NZ)	48
Romania (Romanian Top 100)	22
Russia Airplay (TopHit)	43
Scottish Singles Sales (Official Charts)	14
Sweden (Sverigetopplistan)	45
Switzerland (Schweizer Hitparade)	16
Ukraine Airplay (TopHit)	34
UK Singles (Official Charts)	22
UK Airplay (Music Week)	13

=== Year-end charts ===
Chart (2006)	Position
Austria (Ö3 Austria Top 40)	75
Hungary (Rádiós Top 40)	33
Netherlands (Dutch Top 40)	80
Netherlands (Single Top 100)	77
Switzerland (Schweizer Hitparade)	97

== Release history ==
Region	Date	Format	Label	Ref.
United Kingdom	22 May 2006	CD	Chrysalis	
Australia	19 June 2006	CD	Chrysalis	
