= Make Me Pure =

Single by Robbie Williams

from the album Intensive Care
- Released: 14 November 2005
- Recorded: 2005
- Genre: Pop rock
- Length: 4:33 (album version); 3:49 (radio edit)
- Label: EMI
- Songwriters: Stephen Duffy; Chris Heath; Robbie Williams
- Producers: Stephen Duffy; Robbie Williams

Robbie Williams singles chronology
"Tripping" (2005)	"Make Me Pure" (2005)	"Advertising Space" (2005)

Music video
- "Make Me Pure" on YouTube

"Make Me Pure" is a song by British pop singer Robbie Williams, released as the second single from his album Intensive Care in late 2005. It was written by Robbie Williams, Stephen Duffy, and Chris Heath. It was first released in New Zealand and Australia as a promotional single intended to advertise the album. A video was shot with Williams performing in a garage, however, its performance was poor with focus on Williams' debut single "Tripping" from that album. It was featured on physical copies of the single "Tripping". A physical CD single was released exclusively in Mexico.

== Background ==
The song deals with Williams asking God to make him pure—later in his life. The chorus is a translation of a line of Saint Augustine of Hippo, Da mihi castitatem et continentiam, sed noli modo!

== Chart performance ==
"Make Me Pure" reached number-fifteen in the Netherlands, although it had never been released as a single. Due to airplay of the B-side song of the single "Tripping", it reached the Dutch Top 40 while "Tripping" and "Advertising Space" were also Top 40 hits. In Mexico, the song was released between "Advertising Space" and "Sin Sin Sin" to fill the gap left between these singles. The song was very popular on radio, reaching number twenty-seven; although video airplay was not very strong, the track reached number-nineteen on the Digital Sales chart.

== Track listing ==
1. "Make Me Pure" – 4:34
2. "Make Me Pure" (acoustic version) – 3:53
3. "Tripping" (video)
4. Video clips and photo gallery

== Charts ==
Chart (2006)	Peak position
Netherlands (Dutch Top 40)	15
