= Escapology (album) =

Studio album by Robbie Williams
- Released: 18 November 2002
- Recorded: 2001–2002
- Studios: Capitol, Hollywood; AIR, London; Mayfair, London; Conway, Los Angeles; O'Henry Sound, Burbank; Angel, London
- Genre: Pop rock
- Length: 73:55
- Label: EMI
- Producers: Guy Chambers; Steve Power

Robbie Williams chronology
Swing When You're Winning (2001)	Escapology (2002)	Live at Knebworth (2003)

Singles from Escapology
- 1. "Feel" Released: 2 December 2002; 2. "Come Undone" Released: 31 March 2003; 3. "Something Beautiful" Released: 21 May 2003; 4. "Sexed Up" Released: 3 November 2003

Escapology is the fifth studio album recorded by the English singer-songwriter Robbie Williams. It was released on 18 November 2002 through EMI Records. The album features a guest appearance by singer Rose Stone and was produced by Guy Chambers and Steve Power. The album's lead single "Feel" was released on 2 December 2002, two weeks after the album. The track was an international hit, reaching the top of the charts in Austria, Poland, Germany, Italy, the Netherlands, and top five positions in countries such as Denmark, Ireland and the United Kingdom. Three other singles from the album were released: "Come Undone", "Something Beautiful" and "Sexed Up".

The album debuted at number one in the United Kingdom with first-week sales of over 264,000, becoming Williams' fifth consecutive number one.

The album was supported by the 2003 Tour, which started on 28 June 2003 in Edinburgh, Scotland and ended on 14 December 2003 in Sydney, Australia. During the tour Williams performed three consecutive shows at Knebworth, England on 1–3 August 2003. The three shows attracted a total of 375,000 fans, becoming the "biggest music event in British history".

== Background ==
In 2002, Williams signed a record-breaking £80 million contract with EMI. The contract included a number of provisos, including the label ceding greater creative control to the artist and a commitment to breaking Williams in the American market. In return, EMI affirmed they would benefit from a cut of Williams' non-recording activities, including touring, publishing, and merchandising, thus protecting the company from any commercial downturn in the singer's album sales. So far it is the biggest music deal in British history.

After a year out from recording, Williams began working on what would be his fifth studio album. The album heralded a new era for Williams, as he had taken a more active role in the making of the album, giving an indication of his growing confidence in the studio. "One Fine Day", "Nan's Song" and "Come Undone" were the first three songs that Robbie wrote without Guy Chambers' input. The majority of the album was recorded in Los Angeles. Escapology was arguably conceived as a concept album, due to its lyrical content being totally reflective of Williams' life as a popstar. The album focuses on his hopes, fears and depression over the search of love.

As the contract stated, EMI attempted to break Williams in the American market; to this end the label asked him to tweak Escapology to suit the market. The American release shuffled the song order, removed "Song 3", "Hot Fudge", "Cursed" and one hidden track, added "Get a Little High" and "One Fine Day", and made "How Peculiar (Reprise)" a main album track instead of a hidden track. Williams promoted the album on shows such as Good Morning America, Last Call with Carson Daly and The Tonight Show. This version of the album won the award for Best Album by a Solo Male in the International Category at the Premios Oye! in Mexico.

== Reception ==
Professional ratings
Aggregate scores
Source	Rating
Metacritic	53/100
Review scores
Source	Rating
AllMusic	2/5 stars
Blender	2/5 stars
Entertainment Weekly	B−
Dotmusic	8/10
The Guardian	3/5 stars
NME	2/5 stars
Q	3/5 stars
Rolling Stone	3/5 stars
Stylus	C+
Slant Magazine	3/5 stars

Initial critical response to Escapology was generally mixed. In Metacritic, which assigns a normalised rating out of 100 to reviews from mainstream critics, the album has received an average score of 53, based on 11 reviews.

== Chart performance ==
Escapology debuted at number one in the United Kingdom on sales of 264,104, becoming Williams' fifth consecutive number-one album. It also reached number one in Ireland, Germany, Sweden, Finland, Switzerland, Denmark and Austria. It also reached the top ten in other European countries. However, it failed to make an impact in the United States, only reaching number forty-three on the Billboard albums chart. Escapology became the best selling album of 2002 in the United Kingdom, selling 1.2 million copies, and being certified 6× Platinum by the BPI in December 2003, becoming the sixtieth best selling album of all time in the UK. The album sold over 6.5 million copies worldwide, and over 2 million copies in the UK alone.

== Singles ==
- "Feel", a track written by Williams and Chambers, was released as the album's first single. Originally only recorded as a demo in 1999, Williams attempted to re-record the vocals in 2002, but felt unsatisfied with the result, and thus decided to issue the original demo version instead. When the single was released in late 2002, it became a massive worldwide hit for Williams and reached the top ten in most European countries. It also topped the charts in Argentina, Italy, Hungary, Latvia, Portugal, Mexico, and the Netherlands. The success of the song was so massive that it spent 54 weeks inside the Canadian charts. The video for the song received attention in the United States, due to Hollywood actress Daryl Hannah appearing as his love interest, leading radio stations to play the track.
- "Come Undone", the album's second single, became a top ten hit around the world. However, the video for the song was heavily censored by MTV Networks for depicting Williams having three-way sex with two women. The video also highlighted graphic images of people vomiting and fist fighting, a cockroach crawling out of a person's mouth, and close-up shots of maggots, snakes and insects in close contact with the party goers in the video. The uncensored version of the video was released via a DVD single in Europe, and was also included on the Enhanced CD single. BBC Radio 2 also banned the song for its explicit content. During such furors, it was confirmed that Williams and Guy Chambers were to officially part ways.
- "Something Beautiful", a song which was first offered to Tom Jones, was released as the album's third single. After given to Williams, it was reworked and heavily remixed. The single was released in the summer of 2003, and while it hit the top ten in the United Kingdom, New Zealand, Ireland and Denmark, it failed to make an impact in the world charts. The video included a casting in which people from all over Europe contested to win the chance to perform as Robbie Williams at the end of the video. The three winners had the chance to meet Robbie, and three different versions of the video were released to different parts of the world including the different winners.
- "Sexed Up" was released as the album's fourth and final single, becoming another top ten single for Williams in the United Kingdom. However, it failed to make an impact in the charts elsewhere, the exception being Brazil where it became very popular and gained massive radio airplay because it was part of a soap opera soundtrack.

== Track listing ==
- All the songs produced by Guy Chambers and Steve Power.

No.	Title	Writer(s)	Length
1.	"How Peculiar"	Robbie Williams; Guy Chambers	3:13
2.	"Feel"	Williams; Chambers	4:23
3.	"Something Beautiful"	Williams; Chambers	4:48
4.	"Monsoon"	Williams; Chambers	3:46
5.	"Sexed Up"	Williams; Chambers	4:21
6.	"Love Somebody"	Williams; Chambers	4:10
7.	"Revolution" (with Rose Stone)	Williams; Chambers	5:44
8.	"Handsome Man"	Williams; Chambers; Adrian Deevoy	3:56
9.	"Come Undone"	Williams; Boots Ottestad; Ashley Hamilton; Daniel Pierre	4:38
10.	"Me and My Monkey"	Williams; Chambers	7:12
11.	"Song 3"	Williams; Chambers	3:50
12.	"Hot Fudge"	Williams; Chambers	4:08
13.	"Cursed"	Williams; Chambers; Deevoy	4:01
14.	"Nan's Song"	Williams	3:52
15.	"How Peculiar (Reprise)" (hidden track)	Williams; Chambers	2:14
16.	"I Tried Love" (hidden track)	Williams; Chambers	3:31

American edition
No.	Title	Writer(s)	Length
1.	"Feel"	Williams; Chambers	4:23
2.	"Monsoon"	Williams; Chambers	3:46
3.	"Sexed Up"	Williams; Chambers	4:21
4.	"Get a Little High"	Williams; Ottestad	3:56
5.	"Come Undone"	Williams; Ottestad; Hamilton; Pierre	4:38
6.	"Something Beautiful"	Williams; Chambers	4:48
7.	"Love Somebody"	Williams; Chambers	4:10
8.	"Revolution" (with Rose Stone)	Williams; Chambers	5:44
9.	"How Peculiar"	Williams; Chambers	3:13
10.	"One Fine Day"	Williams	3:35
11.	"Me and My Monkey"	Williams; Chambers	7:12
12.	"Handsome Man"	Williams; Chambers; Deevoy	3:56
13.	"Nan's Song"	Williams	3:52
14.	"How Peculiar (Reprise)"	Williams; Chambers	2:14

Special edition bonus DVD
No.	Title	Length
1.	"My Culture" (Live on Later... with Jools Holland)
2.	"Feel" (Live in Germany)
3.	"Feel" (Live on TOTP)
4.	"Sexed Up" (Live on TOTP)
5.	"Come Undone" (Live on the National Lottery)
6.	"One Fine Day" (Live on the National Lottery)
7.	"Something Beautiful" (Live on CD:UK)
8.	"Come Undone" (Live on TV4, Sweden)

== Charts ==
=== Weekly charts ===
Chart (2002–03)	Peak position
Argentine Albums (CAPIF)	2
Australian Albums (ARIA)	3
Austrian Albums (Ö3 Austria)	1
Belgian Albums (Ultratop Flanders)	1
Belgian Albums (Ultratop Wallonia)	3
Czech Albums (IFPI)	6
Danish Albums (Hitlisten)	1
Dutch Albums (Album Top 100)	1
European Albums (Billboard)	1
Finnish Albums (Suomen virallinen lista)	1
French Albums (SNEP)	3
German Albums (Offizielle Top 100)	1
Greek Albums (IFPI)	8
Hungarian Albums (MAHASZ)	9
Irish Albums (IRMA)	1
Italian Albums (FIMI)	2
Italian Albums (Musica e dischi)	2
Japanese Albums (Oricon)	40
New Zealand Albums (RMNZ)	3
Norwegian Albums (VG-lista)	1
Polish Albums (ZPAV)	3
Portuguese Albums (AFP)	1
Scottish Albums (Official Charts)	1
Singaporean Albums (RIAS)	3
South Korean Albums (Gaon)	8
Spanish Albums (PROMUSICAE)	11
Swedish Albums (Sverigetopplistan)	1
Swiss Albums (Schweizer Hitparade)	1
UK Albums (Official Charts)	1
US Billboard 200	43

=== Year-end charts ===
Chart (2002)	Position
Australian Albums (ARIA)	22
Austrian Albums (Ö3 Austria)	22
Belgian Albums (Ultratop Flanders)	29
Belgian Albums (Ultratop Wallonia)	78
Danish Albums (Hitlisten)	10
Dutch Albums (Album Top 100)	17
Finnish Albums (Suomen viralinen lista)	16
French Albums (SNEP)	102
German Albums (Offizielle Top 100)	26
Irish Albums (IRMA)	8
Italian Albums (FIMI)	14
Swedish Albums (Sverigetopplistan)	16
Swedish Albums & Compilations (Sverigetopplistan)	22
Swiss Albums (Schweizer Hitparade)	17
UK Albums (OCC)	1
Worldwide Albums (IFPI)	16

Chart (2003)	Position
Australian Albums (ARIA)	9
Austrian Albums (Ö3 Austria)	1
Belgian Albums (Ultratop Flanders)	18
Belgian Albums (Ultratop Wallonia)	24
Danish Albums (Hitlisten)	2
Dutch Albums (Album Top 100)	1
European Albums (Billboard)	2
Finnish Albums (Suomen viralinen lista)	5
French Albums (SNEP)	29
German Albums (Offizielle Top 100)	4
Hungarian Albums (MAHASZ)	60
Italian Albums (FIMI)	8
Swedish Albums (Sverigetopplistan)	28
Swedish Albums & Compilations (Sverigetopplistan)	38
Swiss Albums (Schweizer Hitparade)	10
UK Albums (OCC)	27

Chart (2004)	Position
Australian Albums (ARIA)	56
Dutch Albums (Album Top 100)	75

=== Decade-end charts ===
Chart (2000–2009)	Position
Australian Albums (ARIA)	45
UK Albums (OCC)	22

== Certifications and sales ==
Region	Certification	Certified units/sales
Argentina (CAPIF)	2× Platinum	80,000^{^}
Australia (ARIA)	5× Platinum	350,000^{^}
Austria (IFPI Austria)	4× Platinum	120,000^{*}
Belgium (BRMA)	Platinum	50,000^{*}
Canada (Music Canada)	Gold	50,000^{^}
Denmark (IFPI Danmark)	9× Platinum	180,000^{‡}
Finland (Musiikkituottajat)	Platinum	46,225
France (SNEP)	Platinum	300,000^{*}
Germany (BVMI)	4× Platinum	1,200,000^{^}
Greece (IFPI Greece)	Gold	15,000^{^}
Hungary (MAHASZ)	Gold	10,000^{^}
Netherlands (NVPI)	2× Platinum	160,000^{^}
New Zealand (RMNZ)	2× Platinum	30,000^{^}
Norway	—	86,000
Poland (ZPAV)	Platinum	70,000^{*}
Portugal (AFP)	Platinum	40,000^{^}
South Korea	—	10,761
Spain (Promusicae)	Platinum	100,000^{^}
Sweden (GLF)	Platinum	60,000^{^}
Switzerland (IFPI Switzerland)	5× Platinum	200,000^{^}
United Kingdom (BPI)	7× Platinum	2,100,000^{‡}
Summaries
Europe (IFPI)	5× Platinum	5,000,000^{*}
^{*} Sales figures based on certification alone.^{^} Shipments figures based on certification alone.^{‡} Sales+streaming figures based on certification alone.

== See also ==
- List of best-selling albums of the 2000s (decade) in the United Kingdom
