= Come Undone (Robbie Williams song) =

2003 single by Robbie Williams

Single by Robbie Williams

from the album Escapology
- B-side: "One Fine Day"; "Happy Easter (War Is Coming)"
- Released: 31 March 2003
- Studio: Los Angeles, London
- Length: 4:34 (album version); 3:34 (radio edit)
- Label: Chrysalis
- Songwriters: Robbie Williams; Boots Ottestad; Ashley Hamilton; Daniel Pierre
- Producers: Guy Chambers; Steve Power

Robbie Williams singles chronology
| "Feel" (2002) | "Come Undone" (2003) | "Something Beautiful" (2003) |

Music video
- "Come Undone" on YouTube

"Come Undone" is a song by British singer Robbie Williams for his fifth studio album Escapology (2002). Written by Williams, Boots Ottestad, Ashley Hamilton, and Daniel Pierre, it was released as the second single from Escapology on 31 March 2003 by Chrysalis Records. "Come Undone" peaked at number four on the UK Singles Chart and reached the top 20 in seven other European countries.

== Composition ==
"Come Undone" lyrically tells the story of a life of fame unravelling in excess, featuring some "wry" observations from Robbie Williams, including the telling lines of the song's bridge: "Do another interview/Sing a bunch of lies/Tell about celebrities that I despise/And sing love songs/We sing love songs/So sincere".

== Chart performance ==
The song reached number four in the United Kingdom, falling out of the top 10 in its second week. Worldwide, the single did not equal the success of Williams' previous single, "Feel", reaching the top 20 in Austria, Denmark, Germany, Hungary, Ireland, Italy, and the Netherlands.

== Music video ==
The Jonas Åkerlund directed music video features a hungover Robbie waking up in the morning after a house party the previous evening. He then proceeds to walk around the house, wearing pink socks, as flashbacks of the events of the night before are shown. As the song reaches its climax, Williams is seen participating in three-way sex with two women. These shots are interspersed with graphic and unsettling images of snakes, rats and bugs, mostly crawling on women. In the final shots, the two women have been replaced by men in drag.

=== Controversy ===
The video was heavily censored by MTV Networks Europe for depicting a fully clothed Williams having three-way sex with both women and men in drag. The uncensored version of the video was released as a DVD single in Europe and was also included on the enhanced CD single. BBC Radio 2 also banned the song for its explicit content. During this time, it was confirmed that Williams and Guy Chambers were to officially part ways.

== Knebworth performances ==
A memorable performance of the song took place at one of Williams' concerts at Knebworth in August 2003. Singing to 125,000 people, he interjected with "Britain, I'm your son", and further interacted with the audience when he brought a girl up on stage.

== Track listings ==
UK CD single

1. "Come Undone" – 4:34
2. "One Fine Day" – 3:36
3. "Happy Easter (War Is Coming)" – 4:03
4. Photo gallery
5. Robbie video clips

UK cassette single

1. "Come Undone"
2. "One Fine Day"
3. "Happy Easter (War Is Coming)"

European CD single

1. "Come Undone" – 3:34
2. "One Fine Day" – 3:36

UK DVD single

1. "Come Undone" (video) – 4:34
2. "One Fine Day" (audio) – 3:36
3. "Happy Easter (War Is Coming)" (audio) – 4:03
4. Robbie photo gallery
5. Robbie live video clip

== Credits and personnel ==
Credits are taken from the Escapology album booklet.

Recording

- Recorded in Los Angeles and London
- Mixed at The Record Plant (Los Angeles)
- Mastered at Marcussen Mastering (Los Angeles)

Personnel

- Robbie Williams – writing, lead vocals, backing vocals
- Boots Ottestad – writing, keyboards
- Ashley Hamilton – writing
- Daniel Pierre – writing, piano, keyboards
- Phil Spalding – electric guitars, bass
- Neil Taylor – electric guitars
- Jeremy Stacey – drums
- The London Session Orchestra – orchestra
- Gavyn Wright – concertmaster
- Sally Herbert – orchestral arrangement
- Steve Price – orchestral engineering
- Tom Jenkins – assistant orchestral engineering
- Isobel Griffiths – orchestral contracting
- Jim Brumby – programming, additional engineering
- Guy Chambers – production
- Steve Power – production, mixing
- J.D. Andrew – assistant mixing
- Richard Flack – engineering, programming
- Steve Marcussen – mastering

== Charts ==
=== Weekly charts ===
| Chart (2003) | Peak position |
|---|---|
| Australia (ARIA) | 27 |
| Austria (Ö3 Austria Top 40) | 15 |
| Belgium (Ultratop 50 Flanders) | 48 |
| Belgium (Ultratip Bubbling Under Wallonia) | 2 |
| Croatia (HRT) | 10 |
| Denmark (Tracklisten) | 16 |
| Europe (Eurochart Hot 100) | 7 |
| Europe (European Hit Radio) | 1 |
| Finland Airplay (Radiosoittolista) | 2 |
| France (SNEP) | 49 |
| Germany (GfK) | 16 |
| Hungary (Rádiós Top 40) | 6 |
| Ireland (IRMA) | 14 |
| Italy (FIMI) | 11 |
| Italy (Musica e dischi) | 13 |
| Latvia (Latvijas Top 40) | 14 |
| Netherlands (Dutch Top 40) | 8 |
| Netherlands (Single Top 100) | 26 |
| New Zealand (Recorded Music NZ) | 25 |
| Romania (Romanian Top 100) | 3 |
| Scottish Singles Sales (Official Charts) | 2 |
| Sweden (Sverigetopplistan) | 46 |
| Switzerland (Schweizer Hitparade) | 45 |
| UK Singles (Official Charts) | 4 |
| UK Airplay (Music Week) | 6 |

=== Year-end charts ===
| Chart (2003) | Position |
|---|---|
| Netherlands (Dutch Top 40) | 44 |
| Romania (Romanian Top 100) | 18 |
| UK Singles (OCC) | 116 |
| UK Airplay (Music Week) | 35 |

== Certifications ==
| Region | Certification | Certified units/sales |
|---|---|---|
| United Kingdom (BPI) | Silver | 200,000^{‡} |
^{‡} Sales+streaming figures based on certification alone.

== Release history ==
| Region | Date | Format(s) | Label(s) | Ref. |
|---|---|---|---|---|
| Europe | 31 March 2003 | CD | Chrysalis | |
| United Kingdom | 14 April 2003 | CD; DVD; cassette | Chrysalis | |
| Australia | 21 April 2003 | CD; DVD | Chrysalis | |
