= Feel (Robbie Williams song) =

2002 single by Robbie Williams

Single by Robbie Williams

from the album Escapology
- B-side: "Nobody Someday" (demo); "You're History"
- Released: 2 December 2002
- Studio: Los Angeles, London
- Genre: Pop rock
- Length: 4:22 (album version); 3:43 (radio edit)
- Label: Chrysalis
- Songwriters: Robbie Williams; Guy Chambers
- Producers: Guy Chambers; Steve Power

Robbie Williams singles chronology
"My Culture" (2002)	"Feel" (2002)	"Come Undone" (2003)

Music video
- "Feel" on YouTube

"Feel" is a song by English singer-songwriter Robbie Williams. It was released on 2 December 2002 as the lead single from his fifth studio album, Escapology (2002). The song became an international hit, peaking at number one in seven countries and reaching the top five in 10 others, including the United Kingdom, where it peaked at number four.

== Background ==
"Feel" was written by Robbie Williams and Guy Chambers. According to Williams, most of the vocals are from the original demo recording from 1999, as he felt unsatisfied with the re-recorded vocals. He commented, "I just couldn't sing it as well as I did on that day." Chambers said: "The best songs, I think, are the ones that are the most emotional. 'Angels' is very raw, and with 'Feel', Robbie was at his absolute lowest point. He didn't want to write that lyric, but he wrote it because he had to. That's the sort of lyric that I'm interested in, not just words that rhyme nicely."

== Chart performance ==
In the United Kingdom, "Feel" peaked at number four on the UK singles chart, spending four weeks inside the top 10. The song topped the charts in Hungary, Italy, Portugal, and the Netherlands. It was also successful in Canada, where it reached the top 10 and spent a total of 20 weeks on the chart. It was the most played song in Europe in 2003. In the United States, "Feel" reached number 28 on the Billboard Adult Top 40. "Feel" has sold 625,000 copies in the UK as of September 2022.

== Music video ==
The music video for "Feel" was directed by Vaughan Arnell and shows Williams in a cowboy-like lifestyle. It gained some attention in the United States thanks to Daryl Hannah's appearance as Williams' love interest. There were two versions of the same video, one shot in black and white and the other in colour and was filmed in Sundre, Alberta, Canada.

== Track listings ==
- UK, Canadian, and Australian CD single
1. "Feel" (album version) – 4:22
2. "Nobody Someday" (demo version) – 2:53
3. "You're History" – 4:44
4. Photo gallery and video clips
- UK cassette single
1. "Feel" (album version) – 4:22
2. "Nobody Someday" (demo version) – 2:53
3. "You're History" – 4:44
- UK DVD single
1. "Feel" (video) – 4:22
2. "You're History" (audio) – 4:44
3. "Nobody Someday" (demo version; audio) – 2:53
4. 3× video clips
- European CD single
1. "Feel" (album version) – 4:22
2. "Nobody Someday" (demo version) – 2:53

== Credits and personnel ==
Credits are taken from the Escapology album booklet.

Recording

- Recorded in Los Angeles and London
- Mixed at The Record Plant (Los Angeles)
- Mastered at Marcussen Mastering (Los Angeles)

Personnel

- Robbie Williams – writing, lead vocals
- Guy Chambers – writing, bass synthesizer, production, arrangement, orchestral arrangement
- Gary Nuttall – backing vocals, picky guitar
- Zenia Santini – backing vocals
- Anne Skates – directing (gospel choir)
- Fil Eisler – slide guitars
- Neil Taylor – slide guitars
- Phil Spalding – bass
- Andy Wallace – piano
- Dave Clayton – synthesizers
- Jeremy Stacey – drums
- Jony Rockstar – drum loops
- Richard Flack – drum loops, engineering, programming
- The London Session Orchestra – orchestra
- Gavyn Wright – concertmaster
- Nick Ingman – orchestral arrangement
- Sally Herbert – orchestral arrangement
- Steve Price – orchestral engineering
- Tom Jenkins – assistant orchestral engineering
- Isobel Griffiths – orchestral contracting
- Jim Brumby – programming, additional engineering
- Steve Power – production, mixing
- J.D. Andrew – assistant mixing
- Steve Marcussen – mastering

== Charts ==
=== Weekly charts ===
2002–2003 weekly chart performance for "Feel"
Chart (2002–2003)	Peak position
Australia (ARIA)	10
Austria (Ö3 Austria Top 40)	3
Belgium (Ultratop 50 Flanders)	5
Belgium (Ultratop 50 Wallonia)	6
Canada (Nielsen SoundScan)	10
Croatia International Airplay (Top lista)	10
Czech Republic (Rádio – Top 100)	1
Denmark (Tracklisten)	4
Europe (Eurochart Hot 100)	3
Europe (European Hit Radio)	1
Finland (Suomen virallinen lista)	13
Finland Airplay (Radiosoittolista)	1
France (SNEP)	6
Germany (GfK)	3
Greece (Top 50 Singles)	6
Hungary (Rádiós Top 40)	2
Hungary (Single Top 40)	5
Ireland (IRMA)	4
Italy (FIMI)	1
Italy (Musica e dischi)	1
Latvia (Latvijas Top 30)	1
Netherlands (Dutch Top 40)	1
Netherlands (Single Top 100)	1
New Zealand (Recorded Music NZ)	7
Norway (VG-lista)	2
Poland Airplay (Music & Media)	1
Poland (Polish Singles Chart)	1
Portugal (AFP)	1
Romania (Romanian Top 100)	1
Spain (Promusicae)	13
Spain Airplay (Top 40 Radio)	1
Sweden (Sverigetopplistan)	3
Switzerland (Schweizer Hitparade)	4
UK Singles (Official Charts)	4
UK Airplay (Music Week)	1
US Adult Pop Airplay (Billboard)	28

2015 weekly chart performance for "Feel"
Chart (2015)	Peak position
Russia Airplay (TopHit)	194

2023–2026 weekly chart performance for "Feel"
Chart (2023–2026)	Peak position
CIS Airplay (TopHit)	142
Estonia Airplay (TopHit)	120
Finland Airplay (Radiosoittolista)	84
Israel International Airplay (Media Forest)	15
Kazakhstan Airplay (TopHit)	90
Moldova Airplay (TopHit)	119
Romania Airplay (TopHit)	98
Ukraine Airplay (TopHit)	26

=== Monthly charts ===
2025 monthly chart performance for "Feel"
Chart (2025)	Peak position
Ukraine Airplay (TopHit)	73

=== Year-end charts ===
2002 year-end chart performance for "Feel"
Chart (2002)	Position
Canada (Nielsen SoundScan)	112
Europe (European Hit Radio)	95
Ireland (IRMA)	56
Italy (FIMI)	36
Latvia (Latvijas Top 50)	19
Sweden (Hitlistan)	81
UK Singles (OCC)	76
UK Airplay (Music Week)	51

2003 year-end chart performance for "Feel"
Chart (2003)	Position
Australia (ARIA)	64
Austria (Ö3 Austria Top 40)	25
Belgium (Ultratop 50 Flanders)	49
Belgium (Ultratop 50 Wallonia)	44
Europe (Eurochart Hot 100)	10
France (SNEP)	37
France Airplay (SNEP)	6
Germany (Media Control GfK)	34
Italy (FIMI)	14
Latvia (Latvijas Top 50)	19
Netherlands (Dutch Top 40)	6
Netherlands (Single Top 100)	22
Romania (Romanian Top 100)	2
Sweden (Hitlistan)	42
Switzerland (Schweizer Hitparade)	35
Taiwan (Hito Radio)	76
UK Singles (OCC)	172
UK Airplay (Music Week)	22

2025 year-end chart performance for "Feel"
Chart (2025)	Position
Estonia Airplay (TopHit)	156

=== Decade-end charts ===
2000s decade-end chart performance for "Feel"
Chart (2000–2009)	Position
Netherlands (Single Top 100)	77

2020s decade-end chart performance for "Feel"
Chart (2020–2025)	Position
Estonia Airplay (TopHit)	148

== Certifications ==
Certifications and sales for "Feel"
Region	Certification	Certified units/sales
Australia (ARIA)	Gold	35,000^{^}
Austria (IFPI Austria)	Gold	15,000^{*}
Belgium (BRMA)	Gold	25,000^{*}
Denmark (IFPI Danmark)	Platinum	90,000^{‡}
France (SNEP)	Gold	250,000^{*}
Germany (BVMI)	Gold	250,000^{^}
Italy (FIMI)	Gold	25,000^{‡}
New Zealand (RMNZ)	Platinum	30,000^{‡}
Spain (Promusicae)	Platinum	60,000^{‡}
Sweden (GLF)	Gold	15,000^{^}
Switzerland (IFPI Switzerland)	Gold	20,000^{^}
United Kingdom (BPI)	Platinum	625,000
^{*} Sales figures based on certification alone.^{^} Shipments figures based on certification alone.^{‡} Sales+streaming figures based on certification alone.

== Release history ==
Release dates and formats for "Feel"
Region	Date	Format(s)	Label(s)	Ref.
Australia	2 December 2002	CD	Chrysalis	
Europe	2 December 2002	CD	Chrysalis	
United Kingdom	2 December 2002	CD; DVD; cassette	Chrysalis	
Belgium	4 December 2002	CD; DVD; maxi CD	Chrysalis	
Canada	10 December 2002	CD	Chrysalis; EMI	
United States	17 February 2003	Hot adult contemporary radio	Virgin	

== Cover versions ==
After the release of "Feel", contestant Ricky Ord sang the song in the 2003 second season of Deutschland sucht den Superstar for the theme "My Pop Idol", being one of the first contestants eliminated. In season 8 in 2011, contestant Ardian Bujupi sang the song for the theme "English v. German". In 2016, contestants of the tenth season of X Factor Italy sang a medley of "Feel" and "Angels", before being joined by Williams himself to sing his single "Party Like a Russian".

In Williams' 2024 biopic Better Man, "Feel" is performed by Carter J. Murphy, who portrays Williams as a child, and Steve Pemberton, who plays Williams' father Peter.
