= List of songs recorded by Robbie Williams =

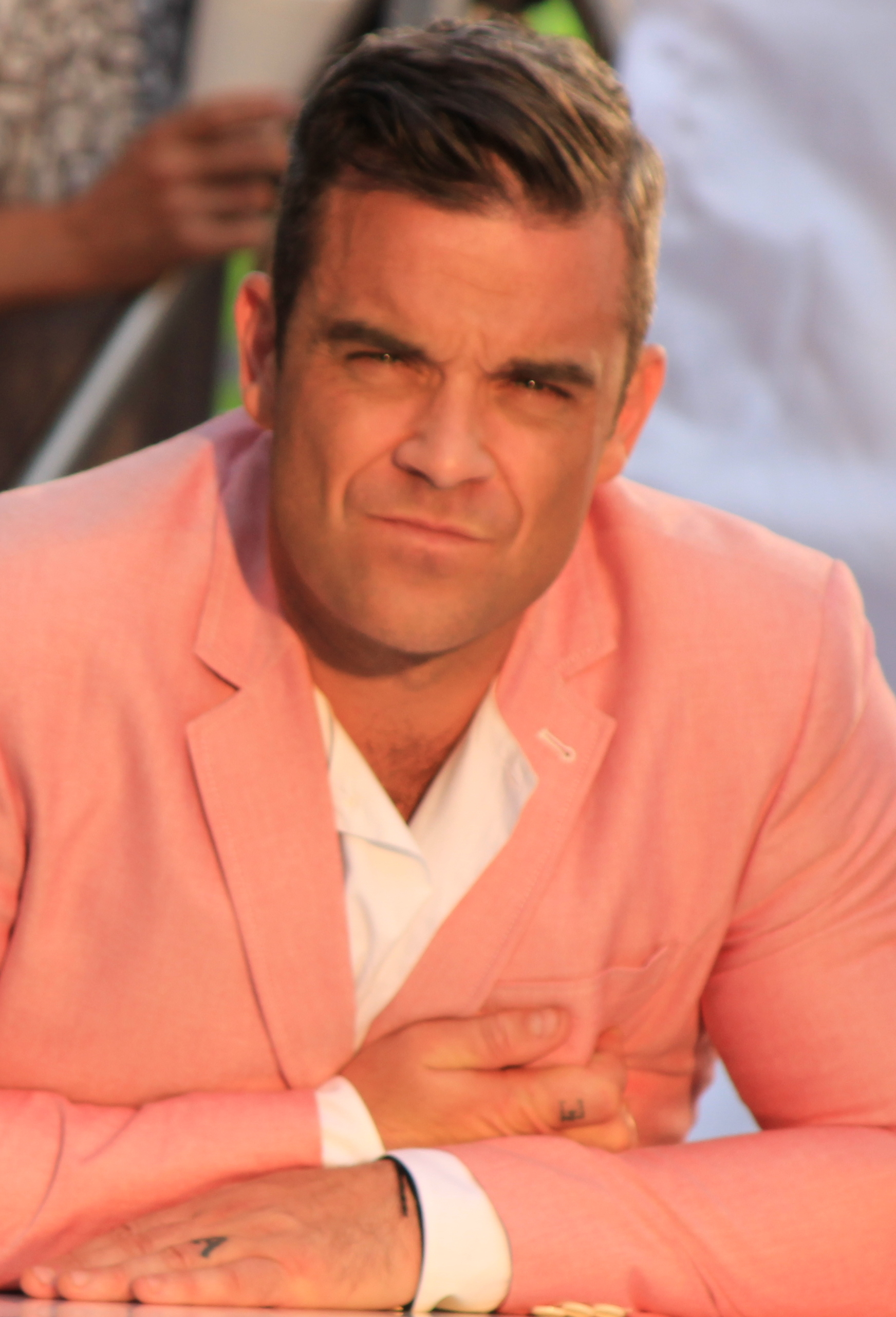
Robbie Williams is a multi-award winning musician. As a solo artist, he released at least one song in each year between 1996–2014

This is a list of Robbie Williams' studio recordings during his time as a solo artist. More details on scarce tracks are given later in the article. Tracks highlighted blue have only appeared on other artists' or compilation albums; rather than Williams' own albums or releases. 62 of the 316 songs listed here are cover versions of songs previously performed by other artists. For details of songs recorded by Williams as a member of Take That, see List of Take That songs.

== Songs ==
Song	Artist(s)	Writer(s)	Album	Year	Notes
100% Beau	Robbie Williams	Robbie Williams Karl Brazil, Owen Parker, Gaz Coombes	Britpop (Deluxe Edition)	2026	
2 Become 1	Robbie Williams, Emma Bunton	Emma Bunton, Victoria Adams, Melanie Brown, Geri Halliwell, Melanie Chisholm, Matthew Rowbottom, Richard Stannard	My Happy Place	2019	Cover of a song by the Spice Girls, rerecorded by Emma Bunton for her fourth solo record
3 Lions 2010	Robbie Williams, as part of 'The Squad'	Ian Broudie, David Baddiel & Frank Skinner	Three Lions 2010; England The Album 2010	2010	Cover of a song by The Lightning Seeds
9 to 5	Robbie Williams	Dolly Parton	Under the Radar Volume 2	2017	Cover of a song originally recorded by Dolly Parton, from the album 9 to 5 and Odd Jobs
16 Tons	Robbie Williams	Merle Travis	Swings Both Ways	2013	Cover of a song originally recorded by Merle Travis, from the album Folk Songs of the Hills
The 80's	Robbie Williams	Robbie Williams, Jeremy Meehan	Rudebox	2006	Part 1 of a musical autobiography
The 90's	Robbie Williams	Robbie Williams, Jeremy Meehan	Rudebox	2006	Part 2 of a musical autobiography
1974	Robbie Williams	Robbie Williams, Stephen Duffy	Radio	2004	The title is a reference to the year in which Williams' was born
A House Without A Mum (Demo)	Robbie Williams	Robbie Williams, Guy Chambers	The Boy in the Dress – Original cast recording	2020	Demo recording for the 2019 musical added as a bonus track
A Man for All Seasons	Robbie Williams	Robbie Williams, Hans Zimmer	Johnny English soundtrack	2003	From the Motion Picture Johnny English
A Place To Crash	Robbie Williams	Robbie Williams, Stephen Duffy	Intensive Care; Robbie Williams: Classic Album Selection (Compilation album)	2005	
The Actor	Robbie Williams	Robbie Williams, Brandon Christy, Craig Russo	Rudebox (Album)	2006	
Advertising Space	Robbie Williams	Robbie Williams, Stephen Duffy	Advertising Space (single); Intensive Care; The Best So Far (Compilation album); In and Out of Consciousness: Greatest Hits 1990–2010 (Compilation album); Robbie Williams: Classic Album Selection (Compilation album)	2005	
Ain't That a Kick in the Head	Robbie Williams	Sammy Cahn, Jimmy Van Heusen	Swing When You're Winning	2001	Cover of a song originally recorded by Dean Martin
All Climb On	Robbie Williams	Robbie Williams and Guy Chambers	Under the Radar Volume 1	2014	
All My Life	Robbie Williams	Robbie Williams, Elliah Heifetz, Freddy Wexler	All My Life (single); Britpop	2026	
All That I Want	Robbie Williams	Robbie Williams, Tim Metcalfe, Flynn Francis	Take the Crown	2012	
Andy Warhol	Robbie Williams	Robbie Williams, Karl Brazil, Ben Castle	Under the Radar Volume 2	2017	
Angels	Robbie Williams	Robbie Williams and Guy Chambers	Angels (Single); Life thru a Lens; The Ego Has Landed (Compilation album); Greatest Hits (Compilation album); The Best So Far (Compilation album); In and Out of Consciousness: Greatest Hits 1990–2010 (Compilation album); Robbie Williams: Classic Album Selection (Compilation album)	1997 |	
Angels (Spanish Version)	Robbie Williams	Robbie Williams and Guy Chambers	The Ego Has Landed (Compilation album); Greatest Hits (Compilation album)	1999	
Antmusic	Robbie Williams	Adam Ant, Marco Pirroni	No Regrets (Single)	1998	Cover of a song by Adam and the Ants, from the album Kings of the Wild Frontier
Appliance of Science	Robbie Williams	Robbie Williams, Max Beesley	Sexed Up (Single)	2003	
Are You Gonna Go My Way	Robbie Williams, Tom Jones	Lenny Kravitz, Craig Ross	Reload (Tom Jones album)	1999	Cover of a Lenny Kravitz song, from the album Are You Gonna Go My Way
Arizona	Robbie Williams	Robbie Williams, Kelvin Andrews, Daniel Spencer	Reality Killed the Video Star	2009	
Average B Side	Robbie Williams	Robbie Williams, K. King	Old Before I Die (Single)	1997	
Baby Girl Window	Robbie Williams	Robbie Williams and Guy Chambers	Life thru a Lens; Robbie Williams: Classic Album Selection (Compilation album)	1997	
Bag Full of Silly	Robbie Williams	Robbie Williams, Chris Heath, Stephen Duffy	Tripping (Single)	2005	A tribute to Williams' home city, Manchester
Bambi	Robbie Williams	Robbie Williams, Timothy Metcalfe, Piers Baron	Under the Radar Volume 2	2017	
Be a Boy	Robbie Williams	Robbie Williams, Tim Metcalfe, Flynn Francis	Be a Boy (Digital Single); Take the Crown	2012	
Berliner Star	Robbie Williams	Robbie Williams & Boots Ottestad	Something Beautiful (Single)	2003	
Best Intentions	Robbie Williams	Robbie Williams, Guy Chambers, Chris Heath	The Heavy Entertainment Show	2016	
Better Days	Robbie Williams	Robbie Williams and Guy Chambers	Old Before I Die (Single)	1997	
Better Man	Robbie Williams	Robbie Williams and Guy Chambers	Better Man (Single); Sing When You're Winning; Greatest Hits (Compilation album); Robbie Williams: Classic Album Selection (Compilation album)	2000	
Beyond the Sea	Robbie Williams	Jack Lawrence, Charles Trenet	Swing When You're Winning	2001	Cover of a song recorded by Charles Trenet, featured on the soundtrack of the animated film Finding Nemo
Big Beef	Robbie Williams	Robbie Williams and Guy Chambers	Sexed Up (Single)	2003	
Bite Your Tongue	Robbie Williams	Robbie Williams, Jason Bell, Ashley Hamilton	Britpop	2026	
Blasphemy	Robbie Williams	Robbie Williams and Guy Chambers	Reality Killed the Video Star	2009	
Bodies	Robbie Williams	Robbie Williams, Brandon Christy, Craig Russo	Bodies (Single); You Know Me (Single); Reality Killed the Video Star; In and Out of Consciousness: Greatest Hits 1990–2010 (Compilation album)	2009	
Booty Call	Robbie Williams	Robbie Williams, Kelvin Andrews, Scott Ralph, Rich Scott, Danny Spencer	Under the Radar Volume 2	2017	
Bongo Bong/Je Ne T'aime Plus	Robbie Williams, backing vocals by Lily Allen	Manu Chao	Bongo Bong and Je Ne T'aime Plus (Single); Rudebox (Album)	2006	Cover of two pop songs originally written and performed by Manu Chao, from the album Clandestino
Break America	Robbie Williams	Uncredited	Released to the longest standing members of Williams fan club	2007	
Bridge Over Troubled Water	Robbie Williams, as part of 'Artists for Grenfell'	Paul Simon	Bridge over Troubled Water	2017	Cover of a Simon & Garfunkel song
The BRITs	Robbie Williams	Robbie Williams and Guy Chambers	Free download from RobbieWilliams.com; Under the Radar Volume 1	2013 (demo), 2014	Originally released for free as the demo 'The Brits 2013'. Criticises the Brit Awards.
Bruce Lee	Robbie Williams	Robbie Williams, Steve McFadden, Stuart Price	The Heavy Entertainment Show	2016	
Bullet	Robbie Williams	Robbie Williams, Tim Metcalfe, Flynn Francis	Under the Radar Volume 1	2014	
Bully	Robbie Williams	Robbie Williams, Tim Metcalfe, Flynn Francis	Under the Radar Volume 1	2014	
Burslem Normals	Robbie Williams	Robbie Williams, Kelvin Andrews, Daniel Spencer	Rudebox (Album)	2006	
By All Means Necessary	Robbie Williams	Robbie Williams and Guy Chambers	Sing When You're Winning; Robbie Williams: Classic Album Selection (Compilation album)	2000	
Bye Bye	Robbie Williams	Robbie Williams, Karl Brazil, Benjamin Roy	Under the Radar Volume 3	2019	
Candy	Robbie Williams	Robbie Williams, Gary Barlow, Terje Olsen	Candy (Single); Take the Crown	2012	
Carry On	Robbie Williams, Kai Elle	Kai Elle	Carry On (Kai Elle Single)	2012	
Charity Song	Robbie Williams, Chris Moyles, Davina McColl, Pixie Lott, Olly Murs, Gary Barlow, Ed Sheeran, Danny O'Donoghue, James Corden, Ricky Wilson	Sandy Beech	The Difficult Second Album (Chris Moyles album)	2012	Style parody of the charity song genre
Cheap Love Song	Robbie Williams	Robbie Williams, Owen Morris, Chris Abbot	South of the Border	1997	
Chemical Devotion	Robbie Williams	Robbie Williams, Nick Lashley	Misunderstood (DVD Single)	2004	
Clean	Robbie Williams	Robbie Williams, Antony Genn, Martin Slattery, Paul Cook, Richard Hawley	Life thru a Lens; Robbie Williams: Classic Album Selection (Compilation album)	1997	
Cocky	Robbie Williams	Robbie Williams, Karl Brazil, Owen Parker, Gaz Coombes	Britpop	2026	
Coffee, Tea and Sympathy	Robbie Williams	Robbie Williams, Billy Morrison, Glen Ballard	Exclusive Xbox DVD; Something Beautiful (Single); In and Out of Consciousness: Greatest Hits 1990–2010 (Compilation album)	2002	
Coke & Tears	Robbie Williams	Robbie Williams and Guy Chambers	It's Only Us/She's The One (Single)	1999	A mock-live song
Collision of Worlds	Robbie Williams, Brad Paisley	Robbie Williams, Brad Paisley	Cars 2 (Soundtrack)	2011	
Come Fly with Me	Robbie Williams	Sammy Cahn, Jimmy Van Heusen	Appears on The BBC program "Robbie the Reindeer: Hooves of Fire"	1999	Cover of a song by Frank Sinatra, from the album Come Fly With Me
Come Take Me Over	Robbie Williams	Robbie Williams and Guy Chambers	Supreme (Single)	2000	
Come Undone	Robbie Williams	Robbie Williams, Ashley Hamilton, Daniel Pierre, Kristian Ottestad	Come Undone (Single); Escapology; Songbook; Greatest Hits (Compilation album); The Best So Far (Compilation album); In and Out of Consciousness: Greatest Hits 1990–2010 (Compilation album); Robbie Williams: Classic Album Selection (Compilation album)	2002	
Comment Section	Robbie Williams	Robbie Williams, Karl Brazil, Owen Parker	Britpop (Deluxe Edition)	2026	
The Cure	Robbie Williams	Robbie Williams, Guy Chambers, Chris Heath	Under the Radar Volume 1	2014	
Cursed	Robbie Williams	Robbie Williams, Guy Chambers, Adrian Deevoy	Escapology	2002	
Dance with the Devil	Robbie Williams	Robbie Williams and Guy Chambers	Released on the DVD 'Where Ego's Dare'	2000	
David's Song	Robbie Williams	Robbie Williams, Guy Chambers, Kara DioGuardi, Jewel Kilcher	The Heavy Entertainment Show	2016	
The Days	Robbie Williams, Avicii	Tim Bergling, Robbie Williams, Vincent Pontare, Salem Al Fakir	The Days (Avicii single); Stories (Avicii album)	2014	
Deceptacon	Robbie Williams	Robbie Williams, Kelvin Andrews, Daniel Spencer, Richard Scott, Scott Ralph	Reality Killed the Video Star	2009	
Deceiving Is Believing	Robbie Williams	Robbie Williams and Guy Chambers	No Regrets (Single)	1998	
Desire (Official FIFA Anthem)	Robbie Williams, Laura Pausini	Robbie Williams, Karl Brazil, Owen Parker, Erik-Jan Grob	Desire (Official FIFA Anthem) (Single)	2025	
Dickhead	Robbie Williams	Robbie Williams, Jeremy Meehan	Rudebox (Album)	2006	Hidden track
Different	Robbie Williams	Robbie Williams, Gary Barlow, Jacknife Lee	Different (Single); Take the Crown	2012	
Difficult for Weirdos	Robbie Williams	Robbie Williams, Kelvin Andrews, Daniel Spencer	Reality Killed the Video Star	2009	
Dirty Rotten	Robbie Williams	Robbie Williams, Karl Brazil, Benjamin Roy	Under the Radar Volume 3	2019	
Do Me Now	Robbie Williams	Robbie Williams, Billy Morrison, Boots Ottestad	Misunderstood (Single); In and Out of Consciousness: Greatest Hits 1990–2010 (Compilation album)	2004	
Do Nothing 'Till You Hear from Me	Robbie Williams	Duke Ellington, Bob Russell	Swing When You're Winning	2001	Cover of a song originally recorded by Duke Ellington and Bob Russell
Do They Know It's Christmas?	Robbie Williams, as part of 'Band Aid 20'	Bob Geldof, Midge Ure	Do They Know It's Christmas? (Single)	2004	Cover of a Band Aid song
Do You Mind	Robbie Williams	Robbie Williams, Kelvin Andrews, Daniel Spencer, Chaz Jankel	Reality Killed the Video Star	2009	
Dogs & Birds	Robbie Williams	Kelvin Andrews, Daniel Spencer, Richard Scott	In and Out of Consciousness: Greatest Hits 1990–2010 (Compilation album; download only)	2010	
Don't Do Love	Robbie Williams	Robbie Williams and Guy Chambers	Supreme (Single)	2000	
Don't Say No	Robbie Williams	Robbie Williams, Stephen Duffy	Advertising Space (Single); In and Out of Consciousness: Greatest Hits 1990–2010 (Compilation album)	2005	
Don't Stop Talking	Robbie Williams	Robbie Williams, Stephen Duffy	Digital single release; In and Out of Consciousness: Greatest Hits 1990–2010 (Compilation album)	2005	Used for promotion of the T-mobile Sony Ericsson mobile phone range, artwork featured in the sleeve notes of Intensive Care
Dream a Little Dream	Robbie Williams, Lily Allen	Fabian Andre, Gus Kahn, Wilbur Schwandt	Swings Both Ways	2013	Cover of a song originally recorded by Gus Kahn titled 'Dream a Little Dream Of Me'. Duet version, included on the album Swings Both Ways
Dream a Little Dream	Robbie Williams	Fabian Andre, Gus Kahn, Wilbur Schwandt	Dream a Little Dream	2013	Cover of a song originally recorded by Gus Kahn titled 'Dream a Little Dream of Me'. Solo version, released as a single
The Edge	Robbie Williams	Robbie Williams, Guy Chambers, Chris Heath	Under the Radar Volume 1	2014	
Ego A Go-go	Robbie Williams	Robbie Williams and Guy Chambers	Life thru a Lens; Robbie Williams: Classic Album Selection (Compilation album)	1997	
Eight Letters [Demo]	Robbie Williams	Robbie Williams, Gary Barlow, Howard Donald, Jason Orange, Mark Owen	Take the Crown	2012	Demo of a Take That song
Elastik	Robbie Williams	Kelvin Andrews, Daniel Spencer, Richard Scott	Morning Sun (Single); In and Out of Consciousness: Greatest Hits 1990–2010 (Compilation album)	2010	
Email from a Vampire	Robbie Williams	Robbie Williams, Kelvin Andrews, Daniel Spencer	In and Out of Consciousness: Greatest Hits 1990–2010 (Compilation album; download only)	2010	
Eternity	Robbie Williams	Robbie Williams and Guy Chambers	Eternity/The Road to Mandalay (Single); Somethin' Stupid (Single); Greatest Hits (Compilation album); In and Out of Consciousness: Greatest Hits 1990–2010 (Compilation album)	2001	
Ev'ry Time We Say Goodbye	Robbie Williams	Cole Porter	Lazy Days (Single)	1997	Cover of a song by Cole Porter
Eyes on the Highway	Robbie Williams	Robbie Williams, Flynn Francis, Piers Baron	Under the Radar Volume 2	2017	
Falling in Bed (Again)	Robbie Williams	Robbie Williams, Matt Hay	Lazy Days (Single)	1997	
Family Coach	Robbie Williams	Stephen Duffy	Advertising Space (Single)	2005	Cover of a song by The Lilac Time
Feel	Robbie Williams	Robbie Williams and Guy Chambers	Feel (Single); Escapology; Greatest Hits (Compilation album); The Best So Far (Compilation album); In and Out of Consciousness: Greatest Hits 1990–2010 (Compilation album); Robbie Williams: Classic Album Selection (Compilation album)	2002	
Forever Texas	Robbie Williams	Robbie Williams and Guy Chambers	Sing When You're Winning; Robbie Williams: Classic Album Selection (Compilation album)	2000	
Freedom	Robbie Williams	George Michael	Freedom (Single); In and Out of Consciousness: Greatest Hits 1990–2010 (Compilation album)	1996	Cover of a George Michael song. The first Robbie Williams solo recording.
Fucking Amazing	Robbie Williams	Robbie Williams, Karl Brazil, Owen Parker	Britpop (Deluxe Edition)	2026	
G.E.M.B	Robbie Williams	Robbie Williams, Karl Brazil, Owen Parker	Britpop (Deluxe Edition)	2026	
Get a Little High	Robbie Williams	Robbie Williams & Boots Ottestad	Sexed Up (Single); Escapology; In and Out of Consciousness: Greatest Hits 1990–2010 (Compilation album)	2002	
Get the Joke	Robbie Williams	Robbie Williams, Gary Nuttal	Angels (Single)	1997	
Ghosts	Robbie Williams	Robbie Williams, Stephen Duffy	Intensive Care; Robbie Williams: Classic Album Selection (Compilation album)	2005	
Goin' Crazy	Robbie Williams, Dizzee Rascal	Robbie Williams, Dylan Mills, Tim Anderson, Jamin Wilcox	Goin' Crazy (Dizzee Rascal single); The Fifth (Dizzee Rascal album)	2013	
Go Gentle	Robbie Williams	Robbie Williams, Guy Chambers, Chris Heath	Go Gentle (Single); Swings Both Ways	2013	
Go Mental	Robbie Williams, Big Narstie, Atlantic Horns	Robbie Williams, Stuart Price, Tyron Lindo, Felix Buxton, Mark Brown, Benjamin Edwards, Michael Kearsey	Under the Radar Volume 2	2017	
Gold	Robbie Williams	TBC	Under the Radar Volume 3	2019	
Good Doctor	Robbie Williams	Robbie Williams, Jeremy Meehan	Rudebox (Album)	2006	
Good People	Robbie Williams	Robbie Williams, Stuart Price, Vera Hall, Ruby Pickens Tartt, John A. Lomax, Alan Lomax	Under the Radar Volume 3	2019	
Gospel	Robbie Williams	Robbie Williams, Tim Metcalfe, Flynn Francis, Jacknife Lee	Take the Crown	2012	
Grace	Robbie Williams	Robbie Williams and Guy Chambers	I've Been Expecting You; Robbie Williams: Classic Album Selection (Compilation album)	1998	
Greenlight	Robbie Williams	Robbie Williams, Tim Metcalfe, Flynn Francis	Under the Radar Volume 1	2014	
Handsome Man	Robbie Williams	Robbie Williams, Guy Chambers, Adrian Deevoy	Escapology; Robbie Williams: Classic Album Selection (Compilation album)	2002	
Happy Easter (War Is Coming)	Robbie Williams	Robbie Williams & Boots Ottestad	Come Undone (Single)	2003	
Happy Song	Robbie Williams	Robbie Williams and Guy Chambers	Strong (Single)	1999	
Have You Met Miss Jones?	Robbie Williams	Richard Rodgers, Lorenz Hart	Swing When You're Winning; Bridget Jones's Diary (Soundtrack)	2001	Cover of a song originally performed by Austin Marshall and Joy Hodges in the musical I'd Rather Be Right, featured on the film 'Bridget Jones' Diary'
He Ain't Heavy, He's My Brother	Robbie Williams, as part of 'The Justice Collective'	Bob Russell, Bobby Scott	He Ain't Heavy, He's My Brother	2012	Cover of a song originally recorded by Kelly Gordon
Heart & I	Robbie Williams	Robbie Williams, Gary Barlow	In and Out of Consciousness: Greatest Hits 1990–2010 (Compilation album)	2010	
Heaven from Here	Robbie Williams	Robbie Williams and Guy Chambers	I've Been Expecting You; Robbie Williams: Classic Album Selection (Compilation album)	1998	
Heavy Entertainment Show	Robbie Williams	Robbie Williams, Guy Chambers, Serge Gainsbourg, Rufus Wainwright, Chris Heath	The Heavy Entertainment Show	2016	
Hello Sir [Poem]	Robbie Williams	Robbie Williams	Life thru a Lens; The Ego Has Landed (Compilation album); Robbie Williams: Classic Album Selection (Compilation album)	1997	Hidden track, a retrospective poem written to Williams' cynical school teacher
Helping Haiti (Everybody Hurts)	Robbie Williams, as part of 'Helping Haiti'	Michael Stipe, Mike Mills, Peter Buck and Bill Berry	Helping Haiti	2010	Cover of an R.E.M. song; 'Everybody Hurts'
H.E.S.	Robbie Williams	Robbie Williams, Tim Metcalfe, Flynn Francis	Under the Radar Volume 1	2014	Title is an acronym for 'Heavy Entertainment Show', not to be confused with the 2016 song Heavy Entertainment Show, also by Robbie Williams.
Hey Little Girl (Demo)	Robbie Williams	Richard Hawley	Life Thru a Lens - 25 Anniversary Edition	1997	Axis Studios demo, recorded in October/November 1996, released in 1997
Hey Wow Yeah Yeah	Robbie Williams	Robbie Williams & Boots Ottestad	Take the Crown	2012	
Hot Fudge	Robbie Williams	Robbie Williams and Guy Chambers	Exclusive Xbox DVD; Escapology; Robbie Williams: Classic Album Selection (Compilation album)	2002	
Hotel Crazy	Robbie Williams, Rufus Wainwright	Robbie Williams, Guy Chambers, Rufus Wainwright	The Heavy Entertainment Show	2016	
How Peculiar	Robbie Williams	Robbie Williams and Guy Chambers	Escapology; Robbie Williams: Classic Album Selection (Compilation album)	2002	
How Peculiar (Reprise)	Robbie Williams	Robbie Williams and Guy Chambers	Escapology; Robbie Williams: Classic Album Selection (Compilation album)	2002	Hidden track, credited as 'How Peculiar (Reprise)' but features completely different lyrics, and is often referred to as 'Save The Children' by fans
Human	Robbie Williams, Jesse & Joy	Robbie Williams, Karl Brazil, Owen Parker	Human (single); Britpop	2025	
Hunting for You	Robbie Williams	Robbie Williams, Tim Metcalfe, Flynn Francis, Jacknife Lee	Take the Crown	2012	
I Am the Res-erection	Robbie Williams	Robbie Williams and Guy Chambers	Let Me Entertain You (Single)	1998	
I Don't Want To Hurt You	Robbie Williams, John Grant	Robbie Williams, Guy Chambers, John Grant	The Heavy Entertainment Show	2016	
(I Feel It But) I Can't Explain	Robbie Williams	Robbie Williams, Stephen Duffy	Misunderstood (Single)	2004	
I Just Want People To Like Me	Robbie Williams	Robbie Williams, Guy Chambers	Under the Radar Volume 3	2018	
I.L.M.P	Robbie Williams, Chris Moyles	Sandy Beech	The Difficult Second Album (Chris Moyles album)	2012	Title is an acronym for 'I Love My Penis'
If I Don't Cry (Demo)	Robbie Williams	Robbie Williams, Guy Chambers	The Boy in the Dress – Original cast recording	2020	Demo recording for the 2019 musical added as a bonus track
Indestructible	Robbie Williams	Robbie Williams, Guy Chambers, Crystal Waters, Neal Brian Conway	Under the Radar Volume 3	2019	
The Impossible	Robbie Williams	Robbie Williams, Léo Ferré, Guy Chambers	Under the Radar Volume 3	2019	
I Started a Joke	Robbie Williams, The Orb	Barry, Robin & Maurice Gibb	Gotta Get a Message to You (Bee Gees tribute album)	1998	Cover of a song by The Bee Gees
I Tried Love	Robbie Williams	Robbie Williams and Guy Chambers	Escapology; Robbie Williams: Classic Album Selection (Compilation album)	2002	Hidden Track
I Wan'na Be Like You	Robbie Williams, Olly Murs	Richard M. Sherman, Robert B. Sherman	Swings Both Ways	2013	Cover of a song originally recorded by Louis Prima; titled 'I Wan'na Be Like You (The Monkey Song)'
I Will Talk and Hollywood Will Listen	Robbie Williams	Robbie Williams and Guy Chambers	Mr. Bojangles/I Will Talk and Hollywood Will Listen (Single); Swing When You're Winning; In and Out of Consciousness: Greatest Hits 1990–2010 (Compilation album)	2001	
I Wouldn't Normally Do This Kind of Thing	Robbie Williams	Neil Tennant, Chris Lowe	Let Me Entertain You (Single)	1998	Cover of a Pet Shop Boys song
If I Only Had a Brain	Robbie Williams	Harold Arlen, Yip Harburg	Swings Both Ways	2013	Cover of a song originally recorded by the cast of The Wizard of Oz
If It's Hurting You	Robbie Williams	Robbie Williams and Guy Chambers	Sing When You're Winning; Robbie Williams: Classic Album Selection (Compilation album)	2000	
In and Out of Love	Robbie Williams	Uncredited	Released to the longest standing members of Williams fan club	2007	
International Entertainment	Robbie Williams	Robbie Williams, Timothy Metcalfe, Piers Baron	Under the Radar Volume 2	2017	
Into the Silence	Robbie Williams	Robbie Williams, Tim Metcalfe, Flynn Francis	Take the Crown	2012	
It Was a Very Good Year	Robbie Williams, Frank Sinatra	Ervin Drake	Swing When You're Winning	2001	Cover of a song originally recorded by Bob Shane, utilizes the archived voice tracks of Frank Sinatra to create a posthumous duet with Williams
It's De-Lovely	Robbie Williams	Cole Porter	De-Lovely (Soundtrack)	2004	Cover of a song by Cole Porter, appears on the film 'De-Lovely'
It's OK Until the Drugs Stop Working	Robbie Williams	Robbie Williams, Karl Brazil, Owen Parker	Britpop	2026	
It's Only Us	Robbie Williams	Robbie Williams and Guy Chambers	FIFA 2000 soundtrack; It's Only Us/She's The One (Single); She's The One/It's Only Us (Single); I've Been Expecting You; In and Out of Consciousness: Greatest Hits 1990–2010 (Compilation album); Robbie Williams: Classic Album Selection (Compilation album)	1999	
Jesus in a Camper Van	Robbie Williams	Robbie Williams, Guy Chambers, Loudon Wainwright III	I've Been Expecting You; The Ego Has Landed (Compilation album)	1998	Removed from later versions of 'I've Been Expecting You' due to Loudon Wainwright III successfully claiming copyright infringement of his song 'I Am the Way' from his 1973 album Attempted Mustache
John's Gay	Robbie Williams	Robbie Williams and Guy Chambers	Kids (Single)	2000	
Karaoke Overkill	Robbie Williams	Robbie Williams and Guy Chambers	Angels (Single)	1997	
Karaoke Star	Robbie Williams	Robbie Williams and Guy Chambers	Kids (Single)	2000	
Karma Killer	Robbie Williams	Robbie Williams and Guy Chambers	I've Been Expecting You; The Ego Has Landed (Compilation album); Robbie Williams: Classic Album Selection (Compilation album)	1998	
Keep On	Robbie Williams	Robbie Williams, Chris Heath, Stephen Duffy	Rudebox (Album)	2006	
Kids	Robbie Williams, Kylie Minogue	Robbie Williams and Guy Chambers	Kids (Single); Sing When You're Winning; Greatest Hits (Compilation album); In and Out of Consciousness: Greatest Hits 1990–2010 (Compilation album); Robbie Williams: Classic Album Selection (Compilation album)	2000	
Kill Me or Cure Me	Robbie Williams	Robbie Williams and Guy Chambers	Kids (Single)	2000	
Killing Me	Robbie Williams	Robbie Williams and Guy Chambers	Life thru a Lens; The Ego Has Landed (Compilation album); Robbie Williams: Classic Album Selection (Compilation album)	1997	
King of Bloke & Bird	Robbie Williams	Robbie Williams, Stephen Duffy	Intensive Care; Robbie Williams: Classic Album Selection (Compilation album)	2005	
Kiss Me	Robbie Williams	Stephen Duffy	Kiss Me (Digital Single); Rudebox (Album)	2006	Cover of a song by Tin Tin
Knutsford City Limits	Robbie Williams	Robbie Williams, Kelvin Andrews, Guy Chambers	Sing When You're Winning; Robbie Williams: Classic Album Selection (Compilation album)	2000	
Kooks	Robbie Williams	David Bowie	Old Before I Die (Single)	1997	Cover of a David Bowie song from the album Hunky Dory
The Lady Is a Tramp	Robbie Williams	Lorenz Hart, Richard Rodgers	Mr. Bojangles/I Will Talk and Hollywood Will Listen (Single)	2002	Cover of a song from the 1937 musical Babes in Arms
Last Days of Disco	Robbie Williams	Robbie Williams, Kelvin Andrews, Daniel Spencer	Reality Killed the Video Star	2009	
Lazy Days	Robbie Williams	Robbie Williams and Guy Chambers	Lazy Days (Single); Millennium (Single); Life thru a Lens; The Ego Has Landed (Compilation album); Greatest Hits (Compilation album); In and Out of Consciousness: Greatest Hits 1990–2010 (Compilation album); Robbie Williams: Classic Album Selection (Compilation album)	1997	
Let Love Be Your Energy	Robbie Williams	Robbie Williams and Guy Chambers	Let Love Be Your Energy (Single); Sing When You're Winning; Greatest Hits (Compilation album); In and Out of Consciousness: Greatest Hits 1990–2010 (Compilation album); Robbie Williams: Classic Album Selection (Compilation album)	2000	
Let Me Entertain You	Robbie Williams	Robbie Williams and Guy Chambers	Let Me Entertain You (Single); Life thru a Lens; The Ego Has Landed (Compilation album); Greatest Hits (Compilation album); The Best So Far (Compilation album); In and Out of Consciousness: Greatest Hits 1990–2010 (Compilation album); Robbie Williams: Classic Album Selection (Compilation album)	1997	
Let's Face the Music & Dance	Robbie Williams	Irving Berlin	Somethin' Stupid (Single)	2001	Cover of an Irving Berlin song
Let's Go All the Way	Robbie Williams, The Wondergirls, Ashley Hamilton	Gary Lee Cooper	Iron Man 3 soundtrack	2013	Cover of a song originally recorded by Sly Fox, featured on the soundtrack of the motion picture Iron Man 3
Life thru a Lens	Robbie Williams	Robbie Williams and Guy Chambers	Life thru a Lens; Robbie Williams: Classic Album Selection (Compilation album)	1997	
Little Green Apples	Robbie Williams, Kelly Clarkson	Bobby Russell	Swings Both Ways	2013	Cover of a song originally recorded by Roger Miller
Lola	Robbie Williams	Ray Davies	Radio 1 Established 1967; In and Out of Consciousness: Greatest Hits 1990–2010 (Compilation album)	2007	Cover of a song by The Kinks from the album Lola Versus Powerman and the Moneygoround, Part One
The Long Walk Home	Robbie Williams	Martin Page	In and Out of Consciousness: Greatest Hits 1990–2010 (Compilation album)	2010	Cover of a Martin Page song
Lonestar Rising	Robbie Williams	Robbie Williams, Kelvin Andrews, Daniel Spencer	Rudebox (Single); Rudebox (Album); In and Out of Consciousness: Greatest Hits 1990–2010 (Compilation album)	2006	
Losers	Robbie Williams, Lissie	Barbara Gruska, Ethan Gruska	Take the Crown	2012	Cover of a song by The Belle Brigade from the album The Belle Brigade
Louise	Robbie Williams	Jo Callis, Philip Adrian Wright, Phil Oakey	Rudebox (Album)	2006	Cover of a song by The Human League from the album Hysteria
Love Calling Earth	Robbie Williams	Robbie Williams, Kelvin Andrews, Guy Chambers	Sing When You're Winning	2000	
Love Cheat [Demo]	Robbie Williams	Robbie Williams and Guy Chambers	Millennium (Single)	1998	
Love Is You	Robbie Williams	Robbie Williams, Jeremy Meehan	Under the Radar Volume 1	2014	
Love My Life	Robbie Williams	Robbie Williams, Gary Go, Johnny McDaid	Love My Life; The Heavy Entertainment Show	2016	
Love Somebody	Robbie Williams	Robbie Williams and Guy Chambers	Exclusive Xbox DVD; Escapology; Robbie Williams: Classic Album Selection (Compilation album)	2002	
Lovelight	Robbie Williams	Lewis Taylor	Lovelight (Single); Bongo Bong and Je Ne T'aime Plus (Single); Rudebox (Album); In and Out of Consciousness: Greatest Hits 1990–2010 (Compilation album)	2006	Cover of a song by Lewis Taylor from the album Stoned, Part I (2002).
Mack the Knife	Robbie Williams	Marc Blitzstein, Bertolt Brecht, Kurt Weill	Swing When You're Winning	2001	Cover of a song originally performed by Kurt Gerron
Make Me Pure	Robbie Williams	Robbie Williams, Stephen Duffy, Chris Heath	Tripping (Single); Make Me Pure (Single); Intensive Care; In and Out of Consciousness: Greatest Hits 1990–2010 (Compilation album); Robbie Williams: Classic Album Selection (Compilation album)	2005	
Making Plans for Nigel	Robbie Williams	Colin Moulding	Old Before I Die (Single)	1997	Cover of the lead single from the XTC album Drums and Wires
Man Machine	Robbie Williams	Robbie Williams and Guy Chambers	I've Been Expecting You; The Ego Has Landed (Compilation album); Songbook; Robbie Williams: Classic Album Selection (Compilation album)	1998	
Marry Me	Robbie Williams	Robbie Williams, Karl Brazil, Ben Castle, Steve McFadden	The Heavy Entertainment Show	2016	
Me & My Monkey	Robbie Williams	Robbie Williams and Guy Chambers	Escapology; Songbook; Robbie Williams: Classic Album Selection (Compilation album)	2002	
Me & My Shadow	Robbie Williams, Jonathan Wilkes	Dave Dreyer, Al Jolson, Billy Rose	Swing When You're Winning	2001	Cover of a hit 1927 pop song recorded by Al Jolson
Meet the Stars	Robbie Williams	Robbie Williams, Stephen Duffy	Tripping (Single); In and Out of Consciousness: Greatest Hits 1990–2010 (Compilation album)	2005	
Mess Me Up	Robbie Williams	Kelvin Andrews, Daniel Spencer	Lovelight (Single)	2006	
Millennium	Robbie Williams	Robbie Williams, Guy Chambers, John Barry, Leslie Bricusse	Millennium (Single); I've Been Expecting You; The Ego Has Landed (Compilation album); Greatest Hits (Compilation album); The Best So Far (Compilation album); In and Out of Consciousness: Greatest Hits 1990–2010 (Compilation album); Robbie Williams: Classic Album Selection (Compilation album)	1998	
Minnie the Moocher	Robbie Williams	Cab Calloway, Irving Mills	Swings Both Ways	2013	Cover of a song originally recorded by Cab Calloway & His Orchestra
Misunderstood	Robbie Williams	Robbie Williams, Stephen Duffy	Misunderstood (Single); Greatest Hits (Compilation album); The Best So Far (Compilation album); In and Out of Consciousness: Greatest Hits 1990–2010 (Compilation album); Bridget Jones: The Edge of Reason (Soundtrack)	2004	
Mixed Signals	Robbie Williams	Brandon Flowers, Dave Keuning, Mark Stoermer, Ronnie Vannucci Jr., Steve McFadden	The Heavy Entertainment Show	2016	
Monsoon	Robbie Williams	Robbie Williams and Guy Chambers	Escapology; Greatest Hits (Compilation album); Robbie Williams: Classic Album Selection (Compilation album)	2002	
More to Life	Robbie Williams, Mams Taylor	Mams Taylor	Personna Non Grata (Un-wel-come Per-son) (Mams Taylor album) [Cancelled before release]; The R-Evolution Of Runk (Mams Taylor Digital Mixtape)	2009	Free download of The R-Evolution Of Runk available at DatPiff.com
Morning Sun	Robbie Williams	Robbie Williams, Don Black, Kelvin Andrews, Daniel Spencer, Richard Scott, Scott Ralph	Morning Sun (Single); Reality Killed the Video Star; In and Out of Consciousness: Greatest Hits 1990–2010 (Compilation album)	2009	
Morrissey	Robbie Williams	Robbie Williams, Gary Barlow	Britpop	2026	Features Barlow on backing vocals
Mr Bojangles	Robbie Williams	Jerry Jeff Walker	Mr. Bojangles/I Will Talk and Hollywood Will Listen (Single); Swing When You're Winning; In and Out of Consciousness: Greatest Hits 1990–2010 (Compilation album)	2001	Cover of a song originally recorded by Jerry Jeff Walker
Ms Pepper	Robbie Williams	Robbie Williams, Flynn Francis, Timothy Metcalfe	Under the Radar Volume 2	2017	
Muñequita Linda (Te Quiero, Dijiste)	Robbie Williams, Thalía	María Grever	Habítame Siempre (Thalía album)	2012	Cover of a Nat King Cole song; 'Te Quiero Dijiste', song title translates as 'Cute Little Doll, I Love You'
Motherfucker	Robbie Williams	Robbie Williams, Flynn Francis, Timothy Metcalfe	The Heavy Entertainment Show	2016	
My Culture	Robbie Williams, 1 Giant Leap, Maxi Jazz	Robbie Williams, Maxi Jazz, Jamie Catto, Duncan Bridgeman, Nigel Butler	My Culture (Single); 1 Giant Leap; In and Out of Consciousness: Greatest Hits 1990–2010 (Compilation album)	2002	Samples the Robbie Williams poem 'Hello Sir'
My Fuck You to You	Robbie Williams	Robbie Williams, Fil Eisler	Under the Radar Volume 2	2017	
Nan's Song	Robbie Williams	Robbie Williams	Escapology; Songbook; Robbie Williams: Classic Album Selection (Compilation album)	2002	
National Treasure	Robbie Williams	Robbie Williams, Guy Chambers, Chris Heath	Under the Radar Volume 1	2014	
Never Touch That Switch	Robbie Williams	Kelvin Andrews, Daniel Spencer	She's Madonna (Single); Rudebox (Album)	2006	Cover of a song by Soul Mekanik
No Fucks	Robbie Williams	Robbie Williams, Guy Chambers	Under the Radar Volume 3	2019	
No One Likes a Fat Pop Star	Robbie Williams	Robbie Williams, Guy Chambers, Chris Heath	Swings Both Ways	2013	
No Regrets	Robbie Williams	Robbie Williams and Guy Chambers	No Regrets (Single); I've Been Expecting You; The Ego Has Landed (Compilation album); Greatest Hits (Compilation album); The Best So Far (Compilation album); In and Out of Consciousness: Greatest Hits 1990–2010 (Compilation album); Robbie Williams: Classic Album Selection (Compilation album)	1998	
Nobody Someday	Robbie Williams	Robbie Williams and Guy Chambers	Exclusive Xbox DVD; Feel (Single); In and Out of Consciousness: Greatest Hits 1990–2010 (Compilation album)	2002	
Northern Town	Robbie Williams	Robbie Williams, Stephen Duffy	Radio	2004	
Not Like the Others	Robbie Williams	Robbie Williams, Tim Metcalfe, Flynn Francis	Take the Crown	2012	
Not of This Earth	Robbie Williams, Gavyn Wright & London Session Orchestra	Robbie Williams, Patrick Doyle	Bridget Jones's Diary: Music from the Motion Picture (Soundtrack)	2001	From the film 'Bridget Jones' Diary'
Numb	Robbie Williams	Robbie Williams, Steve Robson, Ed Drewett	Under the Radar Volume 2	2017	
Often	Robbie Williams	Robbie Williams and Guy Chambers	Kids (Single); In and Out of Consciousness: Greatest Hits 1990–2010 (Compilation album)	2000	
Old Before I Die	Robbie Williams	Robbie Williams, Desmond Child, Eric Bazilian	Old Before I Die (Single); Life thru a Lens; The Ego Has Landed (Compilation album); Greatest Hits (Compilation album); In and Out of Consciousness: Greatest Hits 1990–2010 (Compilation album); Robbie Williams: Classic Album Selection (Compilation album)	1997	
On My Own	Robbie Williams, Tom Jones	Robbie Williams, Kelvin Andrews, Daniel Spencer	Different (Single)	2012	
On the Fence	Robbie Williams	Robbie Williams, Kelvin Andrews, Scott Ralph, Rich Scott	Under the Radar Volume 2	2017	
One Fine Day	Robbie Williams	Robbie Williams	Come Undone (Single); Escapology; In and Out of Consciousness: Greatest Hits 1990–2010 (Compilation album)	2002	
One for My Baby	Robbie Williams	Harold Arlen, Johnny Mercer	Swing When You're Winning	2001	Cover of a song originally recorded by Fred Astaire
One of God's Better People	Robbie Williams	Robbie Williams and Guy Chambers	Life thru a Lens; The Ego Has Landed (Compilation album); Robbie Williams: Classic Album Selection (Compilation album)	1997	
The Only One I Know	Robbie Williams, Mark Ronson	Rob Collins, Jon Day, Tim Burgess, Jon Brookes, Martin Blunt	Version (Mark Ronson album); In and Out of Consciousness: Greatest Hits 1990–2010 (Compilation album)	2007	Cover of a song by The Charlatans
Our Love	Robbie Williams	Robbie Williams, Stephen Duffy	Sin Sin Sin (Single)	2006	
Overture for Berlin	Robbie Williams	Robbie Williams, Stephen Duffy	Advertising Space (Single)	2005	
Party Like A Russian	Robbie Williams	Robbie Williams, Guy Chambers, Sergei Prokofiev, Chris Heath	Party Like a Russian; The Heavy Entertainment Show	2016	
Phoenix from the Flames	Robbie Williams	Robbie Williams and Guy Chambers	Win Some Lose Some (Single); I've Been Expecting You; The Ego Has Landed (Compilation album); Songbook; Robbie Williams: Classic Album Selection (Compilation album)	1998	
The Pilot	Robbie Williams	Robbie Williams, Guy Chambers, Justin Nozuka, Chris Heath	Under the Radar Volume 1	2014	
Please Don't Die	Robbie Williams	Robbie Williams, Stephen Duffy	Intensive Care; Robbie Williams: Classic Album Selection (Compilation album)	2005	
Please Don't Talk About Me When I'm Gone	Robbie Williams, Dean Martin	Sam Stept, Bee Palmer	Forever Cool (Dean Martin album)	2007	Cover of a Sidney Clare song, utilizes the archived voice tracks of Dean Martin to create a posthumous duet with Williams
Please, Please	Robbie Williams	Robbie Williams, Stephen Duffy	Misunderstood (Single)	2004	
Pocket Rocket	Robbie Williams	Robbie Williams, Karl Brazil, Tom Longworth, Owen Parker	Pocket Rocket (single); Britpop	2025	A ballad-style reworking of Rocket
Pretty Face	Robbie Williams	Robbie Williams, Karl Brazil, Martin Terefe, Owen Parker	Pretty Face (Single); Britpop	2025	
Pretty Woman	Robbie Williams	Robbie Williams, Benny Blanco, Steve Robson, Ed Sheeran	The Heavy Entertainment Show	2016	
The Postcard	Robbie Williams	Stephen Duffy	Misunderstood (Single); In and Out of Consciousness: Greatest Hits 1990–2010 (Compilation album)	2004	Cover of a song by Stephen Duffy
The Promise	Robbie Williams	Robbie Williams, Paul Freeman	Different (Single)	2012	Adapted cover of a Paul Freeman song
Puttin' on the Ritz	Robbie Williams	Irving Berlin	Swings Both Ways; Dream a Little Dream	2013	Cover of an Irving Berlin song
The Queen	Robbie Williams	Robbie Williams, Kelvin Andrews, Daniel Spencer	Shame (Single)	2010	
Radio	Robbie Williams	Robbie Williams, Stephen Duffy	Radio; Greatest Hits (Compilation album); The Best So Far (Compilation album); In and Out of Consciousness: Greatest Hits 1990–2010 (Compilation album)	2004	
Raver	Robbie Williams	Robbie Williams, Tim Metcalfe, Flynn Francis	Under the Radar Volume 1	2014	Contains an interpolation of 2012 song 'Shit on the Radio'
Random Acts of Kindness	Robbie Williams	Robbie Williams, Stephen Duffy	Intensive Care; Robbie Williams: Classic Album Selection (Compilation album)	2005	
Reality Killed the Video Star	Robbie Williams	Robbie Williams	Under the Radar Volume 3	2019	
Red Lights (demo)	Robbie Williams	Robbie Williams, Guy Chambers	Life Thru a Lens - 25 Anniversary Edition	1997	Tower Studios demo, recorded January 1997
Reverse	Robbie Williams	Robbie Williams, Tim Metcalfe, Flynn Francis	Take the Crown	2012	
Revolution	Robbie Williams, Rose Stone	Robbie Williams and Guy Chambers	Escapology; Robbie Williams: Classic Album Selection (Compilation album)	2002	
The Road to Mandalay	Robbie Williams	Robbie Williams and Guy Chambers	Eternity/The Road to Mandalay (Single); Sing When You're Winning; Greatest Hits (Compilation album); In and Out of Consciousness: Greatest Hits 1990–2010 (Compilation album); Robbie Williams: Classic Album Selection (Compilation album)	2000	
Rock DJ	Robbie Williams	Robbie Williams, Kelvin Andrews, Guy Chambers, Nelson Pigford, Ekundayo Paris	Rock DJ (Single); Sing When You're Winning; Greatest Hits (Compilation album); In and Out of Consciousness: Greatest Hits 1990–2010 (Compilation album); Robbie Williams: Classic Album Selection (Compilation album)	2000	Music video is famously controversial
Rocket	Robbie Williams, Tony Iommi	Robbie Williams, Karl Brazil, Tom Longworth, Tony Iommi	Rocket (Robbie Williams song) (Single); Britpop (Robbie Williams album)	2025	
Rolling Stone	Robbie Williams	Robbie Williams and Guy Chambers	Let Love Be Your Energy (Single); Better Man (Single)	2001	
Rome Munich Rome [Demo]	Robbie Williams	Robbie Williams and Guy Chambers	Millennium (Single)	1998	
Rudebox	Robbie Williams	Robbie Williams, Kelvin Andrews, Daniel Spencer, Bill Laswell, Earl Collins, Carl Aiken, Robert Shakespeare, Sly Dunbar	Rudebox (Single); Rudebox (Album); In and Out of Consciousness: Greatest Hits 1990–2010 (Compilation album)	2006	
Run it Wild	Robbie Williams	Robbie Williams, Flynn Francis, Timothy Metcalfe, Phillip Steinke	Under the Radar Volume 2	2017	
Satellites	Robbie Williams	Robbie Williams and Stuart Price	Under the Radar Volume 2	2017	
Selfish Disco	Robbie Williams	Robbie Williams, Karl Brazil, Martin Terefe, Owen Parker	Britpop (Deluxe Edition)	2026	
Sensational	Robbie Williams	Robbie Williams, Mike Curb, Mack David, Guy Chambers, Rufus Wainwright, Chris Heath	The Heavy Entertainment Show	2016	
Sensitive	Robbie Williams	Robbie Williams, Stuart Price, Jackson Guthy	The Heavy Entertainment Show	2016	
Ser Mejor	Robbie Williams	Robbie Williams and Guy Chambers	Sing When You're Winning; Greatest Hits (Compilation album)	2000	Spanish Version of 'Better Man'
Sexed Up	Robbie Williams	Robbie Williams and Guy Chambers	No Regrets (Single); Sexed Up (Single); Escapology; Greatest Hits (Compilation album); The Best So Far (Compilation album); In and Out of Consciousness: Greatest Hits 1990–2010 (Compilation album); Robbie Williams: Classic Album Selection (Compilation album)	1998 (demo), 2002 (single)	
Shame	Robbie Williams, Gary Barlow	Robbie Williams, Gary Barlow	Shame (Single); In and Out of Consciousness: Greatest Hits 1990–2010 (Compilation album)	2010	
She Makes Me High	Robbie Williams	Robbie Williams and Guy Chambers	Lazy Days (Single); Life thru a Lens	1997	
She's Madonna	Robbie Williams, Pet Shop Boys	Robbie Williams, Neil Tennant, Chris Lowe	She's Madonna (Single); Rudebox (Album); In and Out of Consciousness: Greatest Hits 1990–2010 (Compilation album)	2006	
She's the One	Robbie Williams	Karl Wallinger	It's Only Us/She's The One (Single); She's The One/It's Only Us (Single); I've Been Expecting You; The Ego Has Landed (Compilation album); Greatest Hits (Compilation album); In and Out of Consciousness: Greatest Hits 1990–2010 (Compilation album); Robbie Williams: Classic Album Selection (Compilation album)	1998	A cover of a World Party song from the album Egyptology
Shine My Shoes	Robbie Williams	Robbie Williams, Guy Chambers, Chris Heath	Swings Both Ways; Shine My Shoes	2013	
Shit on the Radio	Robbie Williams	Robbie Williams, Tim Metcalfe, Flynn Francis, Jacknife Lee	Take the Crown	2012	
Sin Sin Sin	Robbie Williams	Robbie Williams, Stephen Duffy, Chris Heath	Sin Sin Sin (Single); Intensive Care; The Best So Far (Compilation album); In and Out of Consciousness: Greatest Hits 1990–2010 (Compilation album); Robbie Williams: Classic Album Selection (Compilation album)	2005	
Singing for the Lonely	Robbie Williams	Robbie Williams and Guy Chambers	Sing When You're Winning; Robbie Williams: Classic Album Selection (Compilation album)	2000	
Snowblind	Robbie Williams	Robbie Williams and Guy Chambers	Swings Both Ways	2013	Written as early as 2003
Soda Pop	Robbie Williams, Michael Bublé	Robbie Williams, Kelvin Andrews, Scott Ralph, Rich Scott, Danny Spencer	Swings Both Ways	2013	
Some Day	Robbie Williams, Dy Lon	Dy Lon	Some day (Dy Lon Single)	2006	
Somethin' Stupid	Robbie Williams, Nicole Kidman	Carson Parks	Somethin' Stupid (Single); Swing When You're Winning; In and Out of Consciousness: Greatest Hits 1990–2010 (Compilation album)	2001	Cover of a song originally recorded by Carson and Gaile
Something Beautiful	Robbie Williams	Robbie Williams and Guy Chambers	Something Beautiful (Single); Escapology; Greatest Hits (Compilation album); In and Out of Consciousness: Greatest Hits 1990–2010 (Compilation album); Robbie Williams: Classic Album Selection (Compilation album)	2002	
Somewhere	Robbie Williams	Kelvin Andrews, Daniel Spencer, Andy Stubbs, Jonathan Hand, Stephen Cadman	Reality Killed the Video Star	2009	
Song 3	Robbie Williams	Robbie Williams and Guy Chambers	Escapology; Robbie Williams: Classic Album Selection (Compilation album)	2002	
Soul Transmission	Robbie Williams	Robbie Williams, Kelvin Andrews, Daniel Spencer	Different (Single)	2012	
South of the Border	Robbie Williams	Robbie Williams and Guy Chambers	South of the Border; Life thru a Lens; In and Out of Consciousness: Greatest Hits 1990–2010 (Compilation album); Robbie Williams: Classic Album Selection (Compilation album)	1997	
Speaking Tongues	Robbie Williams	Robbie Williams, Johnny McDaid, Ellis Taylor	Under the Radar Volume 2	2017	
Spies	Robbie Williams	Robbie Williams, Karl Brazil, Owen Parker, Martin Terefe	Spies (Single); Britpop (Robbie Williams album)	2025	
Spread Your Wings	Robbie Williams	Robbie Williams, Stephen Duffy	Intensive Care; Robbie Williams: Classic Album Selection (Compilation album)	2005	
Stalkers Day Off (Hanging Around)	Robbie Williams	Robbie Williams, Guy Chambers, Fil Eisler	I've Been Expecting You; Robbie Williams: Classic Album Selection (Compilation album)	1998	Hidden Track
Stand Your Ground	Robbie Williams	Robbie Williams and Guy Chambers	I've Been Expecting You; Robbie Williams: Classic Album Selection (Compilation album)	1998	Hidden Track
Starstruck	Robbie Williams	Robbie Williams, Kelvin Andrews, Daniel Spencer, Paul Beard	Reality Killed the Video Star	2009	
Straighten Up & Fly Right	Robbie Williams	Nat King Cole, Irving Mills	Swing When You're Winning	2001	Cover of a song originally recorded by The King Cole Trio
Strong	Robbie Williams	Robbie Williams and Guy Chambers	Strong (Single); I've Been Expecting You; The Ego Has Landed (Compilation album); Greatest Hits (Compilation album); In and Out of Consciousness: Greatest Hits 1990–2010 (Compilation album); Robbie Williams: Classic Album Selection (Compilation album)	1998	
Summertime	Robbie Williams	Robbie Williams, Antony Genn	Rudebox (Album)	2001	From the motion picture Mike Bassett: England Manager
Super Tony	Robbie Williams	Robbie Williams, Kelvin Andrews, Daniel Spencer, Richard Scott, Scott Ralph	Under the Radar Volume 1	2011	Originally leaked as a demo on Radio Rudebox in 2011. Written in 2007
Superblind	Robbie Williams	Robbie Williams, Fil Eisler	Reality Killed the Video Star	2009	
Supreme	Robbie Williams	Robbie Williams, Dino Fekaris, Freddie Perren, Guy Chambers	Supreme (Single); Sing When You're Winning; Greatest Hits (Compilation album); The Best So Far (Compilation album); In and Out of Consciousness: Greatest Hits 1990–2010 (Compilation album); Robbie Williams: Classic Album Selection (Compilation album)	2000	
Suprême	Robbie Williams	Robbie Williams and Guy Chambers	Sing When You're Winning; Greatest Hits (Compilation album)	2000	French version of 'Supreme'
Surface Noise	Robbie Williams, Sound 5	Kelvin Andrews, Daniel Spencer	No Illicit Dancing (Sound 5 album)	2000	Williams appears under a pseudonym as "Tipsy McStagger", a reference to a fictional conglomerate and its eponymous mascot in the 1991 Simpsons episode "Flaming Moe's"
Surrender	Robbie Williams	Robbie Williams, Tim Metcalfe, Flynn Francis	Under the Radar Volume 1	2014	
Sweet Gene Vincent	Robbie Williams	Ian Dury, Chas Jankel	Brand New Boots and Panties (Ian Dury Tribute album)	2008	Cover of a song by Ian Dury
Swing Supreme	Robbie Williams	Robbie Williams, Guy Chambers, Frederick Perren	Swings Both Ways	2013	Swing version of 'Supreme'
Swings Both Ways	Robbie Williams, Rufus Wainwright	Robbie Williams, Guy Chambers, Rufus Wainwright	Swings Both Ways	2013	
Talk to Me	Robbie Williams	Robbie Williams, Fil Eisler	Rock DJ (Single)	2000	
Teenage Millionaire	Robbie Williams	Robbie Williams and Guy Chambers	Lazy Days (Single); Life thru a Lens	1997	
That Old Black Magic	Robbie Williams, Jane Horrocks	Johnny Mercer, Harold Arlen	The Further Adventures of Little Voice (Jane Horrocks album)	2000	Cover of a song by Glenn Miller
That's Life	Robbie Williams	Dean Kay, Kelly Gordon	Somethin' Stupid (Single); Swing When You're Winning	2001	Cover of a Marion Montgomery song
There Are Bad Times Just Around The Corner	Robbie Williams	Noël Coward	Twentieth-Century Blues: The Songs of Noël Coward (Noël Coward Tribute album)	1999	Cover of a Noël Coward song
These Dreams	Robbie Williams	Robbie Williams and Guy Chambers	I've Been Expecting You; Robbie Williams: Classic Album Selection (Compilation album)	1998	
They Can't Take That Away from Me	Robbie Williams, Rupert Everett	George Gershwin, Ira Gershwin	Swing When You're Winning	2001	Cover of a song originally recorded by Fred Astaire
Things	Robbie Williams, Jane Horrocks	Bobby Darin	Swing When You're Winning	2001	Cover of a Bobby Darin song
Time on Earth	Robbie Williams	Robbie Williams, Guy Chambers, Chris Heath	The Heavy Entertainment Show	2016	
Time on Earth (French Version)	Robbie Williams	Robbie Williams, Guy Chambers, Chris Heath	The Heavy Entertainment Show	2016	
Toxic	Robbie Williams	Robbie Williams and Guy Chambers	Eternity/The Road to Mandalay (Single); Better Man (Single); In and Out of Consciousness: Greatest Hits 1990–2010 (Compilation album)	2001	
Tripping	Robbie Williams	Robbie Williams, Stephen Duffy	Tripping (Single); Intensive Care; The Best So Far (Compilation album); In and Out of Consciousness: Greatest Hits 1990–2010 (Compilation album); Robbie Williams: Classic Album Selection (Compilation album)	2005	
The Trouble with Me	Robbie Williams	Robbie Williams, Stephen Duffy	Intensive Care; Songbook; Robbie Williams: Classic Album Selection (Compilation album)	2005	
Twist	Robbie Williams	Robbie Williams	Advertising Space (Single)	2005	Instrumental only
Ugly Love	Robbie Williams	Robbie Williams and Guy Chambers	Exclusive Xbox DVD	2002	
Underkill	Robbie Williams	Robbie Williams, Scott Ralph, Richard Scott, Kelvin Andrews	Under the Radar Volume 3	2019	
United	Robbie Williams	Robbie Williams and Guy Chambers	Supreme (Single); United (Single)	2000	
Viva Life on Mars	Robbie Williams	Robbie Williams, Kelvin Andrews, Daniel Spencer	Rudebox (Album); Songbook	2006	
Walk This Sleigh	Robbie Williams	Robbie Williams and Guy Chambers	Angels (Single)	1997	
We Are the Champions	Robbie Williams, Queen	Freddie Mercury	A Knight's Tale	2001	Cover of a Queen song, for the motion picture A Knight's Tale
Weakness	Robbie Williams	Robbie Williams, Gary Barlow	Under the Radar Volume 2	2017	
Wedding Bells	Robbie Williams	Robbie Williams, Gary Barlow	Swings Both Ways	2013	
Well, Did You Evah?	Robbie Williams, Jon Lovitz	Cole Porter	Swing When You're Winning	2001	Cover of a song by Cole Porter
We're The Pet Shop Boys	Robbie Williams, Pet Shop Boys	Howard Rigberg	Rudebox (Album)	2006	Cover of a song originally recorded by My Robot Friend, and later by The Pet Shop Boys
When You Know	Robbie Williams	Robbie Williams, Guy Chambers, Seckou Keita, Jimmy Carr	The Heavy Entertainment Show	2016	
Where There's Muck	Robbie Williams	Robbie Williams and Guy Chambers	Swings Both Ways	2013	
White Man in Hanoi	Robbie Williams	Robbie Williams, Tim Metcalfe, Flynn Francis	Different (Single)	2012	
Win Some, Lose Some	Robbie Williams	Robbie Williams and Guy Chambers	Win Some Lose Some (Single); I've Been Expecting You; The Ego Has Landed (Compilation album); Greatest Hits (Compilation album); Robbie Williams: Classic Album Selection (Compilation album)	1998	
Won't Do That	Robbie Williams	Robbie Williams, Kelvin Andrews, Daniel Spencer, Richard Scott, Scott Ralph	Reality Killed the Video Star	2009	
You	Robbie Williams	Robbie Williams, Karl Brazil, Owen Parker	Britpop	2026	
You Got Old	Robbie Williams, Jonny Wilkes	Robbie Williams, Kelvin Andrews, Scott Ralph, Rich Scott	Go Gentle; Dream a Little Dream; Shine My Shoes	2013	
You Know Me	Robbie Williams	Robbie Williams, Françoise Hardy, Kelvin Andrews, Daniel Spencer	You Know Me (Single); Reality Killed the Video Star; In and Out of Consciousness: Greatest Hits 1990–2010 (Compilation album)	2009	
Your Gay Friend	Robbie Williams	Robbie Williams, Stephen Duffy	Intensive Care; Robbie Williams: Classic Album Selection (Compilation album)	2005	
You're History	Robbie Williams	Robbie Williams and Guy Chambers	Feel (Single)	2002	
You're the Why	Robbie Williams, Ian Dury and The Blockheads	Ian Dury, Chaz Jankel	Ten More Turnips from the Tip (Ian Dury and the Blockheads' posthumous album)	2002	

== Scarce tracks ==
Although Williams has led an extremely public solo career, certain recordings remain scarce, mainly due to their unavailability as a digital download, or international unavailability.

Song	Appears on
Dance With The Devil	Appears on The Robbie Williams DVD "Where Egos Dare"
Angels (Spanish Version)	Appears only on national versions of The Ego Has Landed and Greatest Hits
Some Day (With Dy Lon)	Unknown. Reportedly briefly released as a free single on iTunes.
Supréme	Appears on national versions of Sing When You're Winning and Greatest Hits, available as a single in France
Get The Joke	Appears only on CD1 of the single 'Angels'
The Queen	Appears only on the CD single of 'Shame'
Ugly Love	Appears on a German 'Exclusive Xbox DVD', released while Williams' was under the sponsorship of Microsoft during his Escapology Tour
Break America	Released only to the longest standing members of Williams fan club through Robbiewilliams.com
In & Out Of Love	Released only to the longest standing members of Williams fan club through Robbiewilliams.com
Come Fly With Me	Appears on The BBC program "Robbie the Reindeer: Hooves of Fire", available on DVD
We Are The Champions (With Queen)	From the film A Knight's Tale, available on the CD soundtrack
There Are Bad Times Just Around The Corner	Available on the Noël Coward Tribute album 'Twentieth-Century Blues: The Songs of Noël Coward'

== Unreleased ==
Many tracks recorded by Williams have never been commercially released. Some of these unreleased songs that have leaked as demos are listed here:

- Go Now (recorded in 1995 after Williams left Take That, played on Radio Rudebox in 2013)
- Disco Delilah
