= Robbie Williams discography =

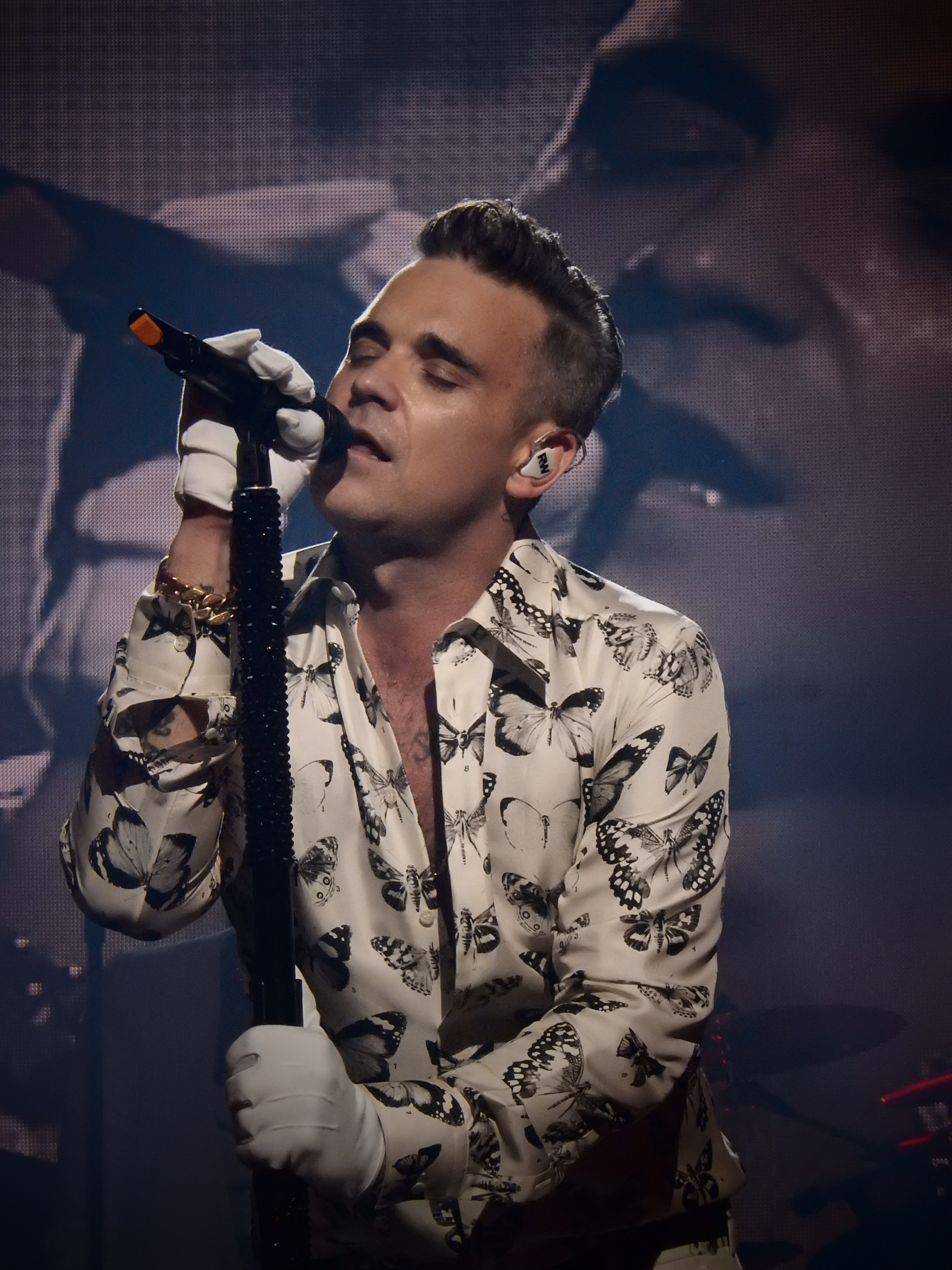
- Williams performing in 2016
- Studio albums: 13
- Extended plays: 1
- Soundtrack albums: 1
- Live albums: 1
- Compilation albums: 10
- Singles: 68
- Video albums: 11
- Music videos: 58
- Promotional singles: 6

The English singer-songwriter Robbie Williams has released thirteen studio albums, one soundtrack album, one live album, ten compilation albums, one extended play, eleven video albums, sixty-eight singles (including nine as a featured artist), six promotional singles and fifty-eight music videos (including two as a featured artist). Williams originally found success in the male pop group Take That, which he joined in 1990 following a successful audition: they released a series of UK number-one singles, including "Pray", "Relight My Fire", "Babe" and "Back for Good". Williams left Take That in 1995 to pursue a solo career; the group disbanded the following year.

His first single, a cover of English singer George Michael's "Freedom", reached number two on the UK Singles Chart in 1996. Life thru a Lens, Williams' debut studio album, was released the following year. Although the album initially sold poorly, strong radio play of its fourth single, "Angels", helped to increase sales of Life thru a Lens, leading to it topping the UK Albums Chart and later being certified eight times platinum by the British Phonographic Industry (BPI). Although it only reached number four in the United Kingdom, consistent sales eventually led "Angels" to be certified double platinum by the BPI; the single also reached the top ten of the French, German and Swiss singles charts.

Williams released his second album, I've Been Expecting You, in October 1998. It too topped the UK Albums Chart and experienced reasonable international success, reaching the top twenty of several worldwide charts. Two of the album's singles, "Millennium" and the double A-side "She's the One" / "It's Only Us", became Williams' first singles as a solo artist to top the UK Singles Chart. Sing When You're Winning followed in August 2000, and became his first to achieve significant overseas commercial success, topping many national album charts and including the UK number-ones "Rock DJ" and "Eternity" / "The Road to Mandalay". A collection of covers of popular swing songs, entitled Swing When You're Winning, was released in November 2001 and his cover of the Carson Parks song "Somethin' Stupid" with actress Nicole Kidman became his most successful single to date, reaching the top three of many singles charts and peaking at number one in the United Kingdom and New Zealand. During 2002, Williams collaborated with concept band 1 Giant Leap on their single "My Culture", which reached number nine in the UK. His next two albums, Escapology (2002) and Intensive Care (2005), maintained this success, both topping the UK Albums Chart, and contained the international top-five hits "Feel" and "Tripping". Williams released his first live album, Live at Knebworth, in 2003 and his first greatest hits album, Greatest Hits, in 2004, with the latter certified six times platinum by the BPI and eight times platinum by the Australian Recording Industry Association (ARIA).

Following a deliberate break from media scrutiny, Williams released his seventh album Rudebox in October 2006 to great public anticipation. Despite a lukewarm critical reception, it matched the chart success of its predecessors, becoming Williams' seventh album in a row to reach number one in the United Kingdom and spawning the UK number-four single of the same name.

His eighth album, Reality Killed the Video Star, followed in November 2009, but became his first studio album not to reach number one on the UK Albums Chart, charting at number two. The single "Bodies" reached number two in the UK and topped several European singles charts. Another retrospective compilation album, In and Out of Consciousness: Greatest Hits 1990–2010 was released in 2010, reaching number one in the UK: during the year, Williams also returned to Take That, who had reformed in 2006 without him. Take the Crown, Williams' ninth studio album, was released in November 2012 and featured the UK number-one single "Candy"; his tenth studio album, Swings Both Ways, was released the following year and became the one thousandth album to top the UK Albums Chart.

As of January 2026, Williams has had 14 UK number-one singles (seven solo and seven with Take That; not including being part of four number-one charity singles) and holds the title for the most ever UK Number One Albums (16) in the history of the Official Charts, breaking the record initially set by The Beatles (15) with the release of his thirteenth studio album Britpop. He has sold a total of 21,108,856 album units as a solo artist, selling 17.2 million of those in the 21st century, being the highest ever selling artist in the UK during this time period.

== Albums ==
=== Studio albums ===
List of studio albums, with selected chart positions, sales figures and certifications
Title	Album details	Peak chart positions										Sales	Certifications
Title	Album details	UK	AUS	AUT	FRA	GER	IRL	NLD	NZ	SWE	SWI	Sales	Certifications
Life thru a Lens	Released: 29 September 1997 (UK); Labels: Chrysalis, EMI; Formats: CD, LP, MD, cassette	1	34	33	34	42	5	59	24	—	39	UK: 2,105,561 (Note: Sales as of 18 November 2019.)	BPI: 8× Platinum; ARIA: Gold; BVMI: Gold; IFPI SWI: Gold; NVPI: Gold
I've Been Expecting You	Released: 26 October 1998 (UK); Labels: Chrysalis, EMI; Formats: CD, LP, MD, cassette	1	—	24	31	16	1	35	4	21	19	UK: 2,630,892 (Note: Sales as of 23 January 2026.)	BPI: 10× Platinum; BVMI: Gold; IFPI SWE: Gold; IFPI SWI: Platinum; NVPI: Gold; RMNZ: Platinum; SNEP: 2× Gold
Sing When You're Winning	Released: 28 August 2000 (UK); Labels: Chrysalis, EMI; Formats: CD, LP, MD, cassette	1	7	4	19	1	1	3	1	4	2	UK: 2,214,602	BPI: 8× Platinum; ARIA: 3× Platinum; BVMI: 3× Gold; IFPI AUT: Gold; IFPI SWE: Platinum; IFPI SWI: Gold; NVPI: Platinum; RMNZ: 7× Platinum; SNEP: Gold
Swing When You're Winning	Released: 19 November 2001 (UK); Labels: Chrysalis, EMI; Formats: CD, LP, cassette	1	3	1	21	1	1	2	1	4	1	UK: 2,466,945	BPI: 8× Platinum; ARIA: 4× Platinum; BVMI: 5× Platinum; IFPI AUT: 4× Platinum; IFPI SWE: Platinum; IFPI SWI: 3× Platinum; NVPI: 2× Platinum; RMNZ: 5× Platinum; SNEP: Gold
Escapology	Released: 18 November 2002 (UK); Labels: Chrysalis, EMI; Formats: CD, LP, cassette	1	3	1	3	1	1	1	3	1	1	UK: 2,089,528	BPI: 7× Platinum; ARIA: 5× Platinum; BVMI: 4× Platinum; IFPI AUT: 4× Platinum; IFPI SWE: Platinum; IFPI SWI: 5× Platinum; NVPI: 2× Platinum; RMNZ: 2× Platinum; SNEP: Platinum
Intensive Care	Released: 24 October 2005 (UK); Labels: Chrysalis, EMI; Formats: CD, LP, digital download	1	1	1	2	1	1	1	1	1	1	UK: 1,619,894 (Note: Sales as of 9 May 2016.); Worldwide: 6,200,000 (Note: Sales of Intensive Care worldwide as of 13 January 2006.)	BPI: 5× Platinum; ARIA: 3× Platinum; BVMI: 5× Platinum; IFPI AUT: 3× Platinum; IFPI SWE: Platinum; IFPI SWI: 3× Platinum; IRMA: 5× Platinum; NVPI: 2× Platinum; RMNZ: Platinum; SNEP: 2× Platinum
Rudebox	Released: 23 October 2006 (UK); Labels: Chrysalis, EMI; Formats: CD, LP, digital download	1	1	1	3	1	2	2	14	2	1	UK: 515,085	BPI: 2× Platinum; ARIA: 2× Platinum; BVMI: 3× Platinum; IFPI AUT: 2× Platinum; IFPI SWE: Gold; IFPI SWI: 2× Platinum; IRMA: 2× Platinum; NVPI: Platinum; SNEP: Platinum
Reality Killed the Video Star	Released: 6 November 2009 (UK); Label: Virgin; Formats: CD, digital download	2	1	1	2	1	6	1	7	2	1	UK: 905,469	BPI: 3× Platinum; ARIA: Platinum; BVMI: 2× Platinum; IFPI AUT: Platinum; IFPI SWE: Gold; IFPI SWI: Platinum; IRMA: Gold; NVPI: Gold; RMNZ: Gold; SNEP: Platinum
Take the Crown	Released: 2 November 2012 (UK); Labels: Island, Universal; Formats: CD, LP, digital download	1	4	1	9	1	1	1	12	7	1	UK: 519,585	BPI: Platinum; ARIA: Gold; BVMI: Platinum; IFPI AUT: Platinum; IFPI SWI: Gold; IRMA: Gold; NVPI: Platinum
Swings Both Ways	Released: 18 November 2013 (UK); Labels: Island, Universal; Formats: CD, LP, digital download	1	2	1	38	1	2	2	12	5	1	UK: 746,279	BPI: 2× Platinum; ARIA: Platinum; BVMI: 5× Gold; IFPI AUT: 4× Platinum; IFPI SWI: Platinum; IRMA: Gold; RMNZ: Gold
The Heavy Entertainment Show	Released: 4 November 2016 (UK); Label: Columbia; Formats: CD, LP, digital download	1	4	3	19	2	1	1	17	7	1	UK: 343,504 (Note: Sales as of 11 July 2017.); FR: 10,000	BPI: Platinum; ARIA: Gold; BVMI: Gold; IFPI AUT: Gold; NVPI: Gold
The Christmas Present	Released: 22 November 2019; Label: Columbia; Formats: CD, LP, cassette, digital download, streaming	1	1	1	53	1	7	6	2	31	1	UK: 100,000 (Note: UK sales as of 9 December 2019)	BPI: Gold; BVMI: Gold; IFPI AUT: Platinum; IFPI SWI: Gold
Britpop	Released: 16 January 2026; Label: Columbia; Formats: CD, LP, cassette, digital download, streaming	1	5	5	97	3	15	24	—	—	2	UK: 34,157 (Note: Sales as of 23 January 2026.)	
"—" denotes a recording that did not chart or was not released in that territory.

=== Soundtrack albums ===
List of soundtrack albums, with selected chart positions
Title	Album details	Peak chart positions							
Title	Album details	UK	AUS	AUT	BEL (FL)	GER	GRE	IRL	SWI
Better Man (Original Motion Picture Soundtrack)	Released: 27 December 2024; Labels: Sony; Formats: CD, LP, digital download, streaming	1	5	36	168	3	69	1	58

=== Live albums ===
List of live albums, with selected chart positions and certifications
Title	Album details	Peak chart positions										Sales	Certifications
Title	Album details	UK	AUS	AUT	FRA	GER	IRL	NLD	NZ	SWE	SWI	Sales	Certifications
Live at Knebworth (Note: In certain countries, Live at Knebworth was released under the title Live Summer 2003.)	Released: 29 September 2003 (UK); Labels: Chrysalis, EMI; Formats: CD, cassette	2	3	1	12	1	2	3	6	7	2	UK: 634,197	BPI: 2× Platinum; ARIA: 3× Platinum; BVMI: 4× Platinum; IFPI AUT: Platinum; IFPI SWE: Gold; IFPI SWI: 2× Platinum; NVPI: Gold; RMNZ: Platinum; SNEP: Gold

=== Compilation albums ===
List of compilation albums, with selected chart positions, sales figures and certifications
Title	Album details	Peak chart positions										Sales	Certifications
Title	Album details	UK	AUS	AUT	BEL (FL)	GER	IRL	NLD	NZ	SWE	SWI	Sales	Certifications
The Ego Has Landed	Released: 13 May 1999 (AUS); Labels: Chrysalis, EMI; Formats: CD, cassette	—	20	—	—	—	—	—	1	—	—		BPI: Gold; ARIA: Gold; RMNZ: 9× Platinum
Greatest Hits	Released: 18 October 2004 (UK); Labels: Chrysalis, EMI; Formats: CD, digital download	1	1	1	2	1	1	1	1	2	1	UK: 2,684,529; Worldwide: 6,000,000 (Note: Sales of Greatest Hits worldwide as of 4 June 2005.)	BPI: 8× Platinum; ARIA: 8× Platinum; BRMA: Platinum; BVMI: 4× Platinum; IFPI AUT: 4× Platinum; IFPI SWE: Gold; IFPI SWI: 3× Platinum; NVPI: Platinum; RMNZ: 2× Platinum
Songbook	Released: 11 October 2009 (UK); Label: EMI; Formats: CD	—	—	—	—	—	—	—	—	—	—		
In and Out of Consciousness: Greatest Hits 1990–2010	Released: 11 October 2010 (UK); Label: Virgin; Formats: CD, digital download	1	3	1	2	1	2	3	17	4	4	UK: 717,444	BPI: 2× Platinum; ARIA: Gold; BRMA: Gold; BVMI: Platinum; IFPI AUT: Gold; IRMA: Gold
The Definitive Collector's Edition	Released: 6 December 2010 (UK); Label: Virgin; Formats: CD, digital download	—	—	—	—	—	—	—	—	—	—		
Robbie Williams: Classic Album Selection	Released: 25 November 2013 (UK); Label: Universal; Formats: CD box set, digital download	—	—	—	—	—	—	—	—	—	—		
Under the Radar Vol. 1	Released: 8 December 2014; Label: Self-released; Formats: CD, digital download	—	—	—	—	—	—	—	—	—	—		
Under the Radar Vol. 2	Released: 30 November 2017; Label: Self-released; Formats: CD, digital download	—	—	—	—	—	—	—	—	—	—		
Under the Radar Vol. 3	Released: 14 February 2019; Label: Self-released; Formats: CD, digital download	—	—	—	—	—	—	—	—	—	—		
XXV	Released: 9 September 2022; Label: Columbia; Formats: CD, cassette, digital download, streaming, vinyl	1	2	3	3	3	1	1	40	—	4		BPI: Silver
"—" denotes a recording that did not chart or was not released in that territory.

== Extended plays ==
List of extended plays
Title	EP details
iTunes Live from London	Released: 18 December 2009 (UK); Labels: Chrysalis, EMI; Formats: Digital download

== Singles ==
=== As lead artist ===
List of singles as lead artist, with selected chart positions and certifications, showing year released and album name
Title	Year	Peak chart positions										Certifications	Album
Title	Year	UK	AUS	AUT	FRA	GER	IRL	NLD	NZ	SWE	SWI	Certifications	Album
"Freedom"	1996	2	6	19	—	10	6	10	39	24	8	BPI: Silver	Non-album single
"Old Before I Die"	1997	2	56	30	—	37	11	32	—	—	30	BPI: Silver	Life thru a Lens
"Lazy Days"	1997	8	—	—	—	90	—	— (Note: "Lazy Days" did not enter the Dutch Top 40, but peaked at number 18 on the Dutch Tipparade chart, which acts as an extension to the Dutch Top 40.)	—	—	—		Life thru a Lens
"South of the Border"	1997	14	—	—	—	—	—	—	— (Note: "South of the Border" did not enter the Dutch Top 40, but peaked at number 21 on the Dutch Tipparade chart, which acts as an extension to the Dutch Top 40.)	—	—		Life thru a Lens
"Angels"	1997	4	40	12	7	9	2	14	23	13	4	BPI: 4× Platinum; BVMI: Platinum; RMNZ: 3× Platinum; SNEP: Gold	Life thru a Lens
"Let Me Entertain You"	1998	3	46	—	—	—	13	— (Note: "Let Me Entertain You" did not enter the Dutch Top 40, but peaked at number two on the Dutch Tipparade chart, which acts as an extension to the Dutch Top 40.)	33	—	—	BPI: Platinum; RMNZ: Platinum	Life thru a Lens
"Millennium"	1998	1	24	18	18	41	1	29	3	12	18	BPI: Platinum	I've Been Expecting You
"No Regrets"	1998	4	—	34	67	60	15	— (Note: "No Regrets" did not enter the Dutch Top 40, but peaked at number 14 on the Dutch Tipparade chart, which acts as an extension to the Dutch Top 40.)	29	43	—	BPI: Silver	I've Been Expecting You
"Strong"	1999	4	—	—	—	68	12	— (Note: "Strong" did not enter the Dutch Top 40, but peaked at number 7 on the Dutch Tipparade chart, which acts as an extension to the Dutch Top 40.)	9	—	—	BPI: Silver	I've Been Expecting You
"She's the One" / "It's Only Us"	1999	1	—	16	74	27	9	29	3	42	20	BPI: Platinum; RMNZ: Gold	I've Been Expecting You
"Win Some Lose Some"	2000	—	—	—	—	—	—	—	7	—	—		I've Been Expecting You
"Rock DJ"	2000	1	4	7	40	9	1	6	1	18	9	BPI: 2× Platinum; ARIA: Platinum; RMNZ: 2× Platinum	Sing When You're Winning
"Kids" (with Kylie Minogue)	2000	2	14	—	—	47	9	11	5	31	35	BPI: Gold; ARIA: Gold	Sing When You're Winning
"Supreme"	2000	4	14	3	12	14	10	8	3	14	4	BPI: Silver; SNEP: Gold	Sing When You're Winning
"Let Love Be Your Energy"	2001	10	53	54	—	68	26	21	11	—	56		Sing When You're Winning
"Eternity/The Road to Mandalay"	2001	1	—	9	45	7	2	17	1	34	10	BPI: Gold; BVMI: Gold	Sing When You're Winning
"Better Man"	2001	— (Note: "Better Man" did not enter the UK Singles Chart Top 100, but peaked at number 98 on the UK Singles Downloads Chart.)	6	—	—	—	—	—	4	—	—	ARIA: Gold; RMNZ: Gold	Sing When You're Winning
"Somethin' Stupid" (with Nicole Kidman)	2001	1	8	2	16	2	2	9	1	17	3	BPI: Platinum; ARIA: Gold; BVMI: Gold; IFPI AUT: Gold; IFPI SWI: Gold; RMNZ: Gold; SNEP: Gold	Swing When You're Winning
"Mr. Bojangles/I Will Talk and Hollywood Will Listen"	2002	—	—	—	—	77	—	— (Note: "Mr. Bojangles" / "I Will Talk and Hollywood Will Listen" did not enter the Dutch Top 40, but peaked at number 12 on the Dutch Tipparade chart, which acts as an extension to the Dutch Top 40.)	—	—	68	BPI: Silver	Swing When You're Winning
"Feel"	2002	4	10	3	6	3	4	1	7	3	4	BPI: Platinum; ARIA: Gold; BVMI: Gold; IFPI AUT: Gold; IFPI SWE: Gold; IFPI SWI: Gold; RMNZ: Platinum; SNEP: Gold	Escapology
"Come Undone"	2003	4	27	15	49	16	14	8	25	46	45	BPI: Silver	Escapology
"Something Beautiful"	2003	3	24	19	70	46	6	8	7	—	52		Escapology
"Sexed Up"	2003	10	17	45	—	53	18	12	25	—	59		Escapology
"Radio"	2004	1	12	3	48	2	6	9	—	22	14	ARIA: Gold	Greatest Hits
"Misunderstood"	2004	8	39	21	—	20	27	8	—	35	26		Greatest Hits
"Tripping"	2005	2	7	2	9	1	4	1	20	2	2	BPI: Silver; ARIA: Gold; IFPI SWI: Gold; SNEP: Gold	Intensive Care
"Make Me Pure"	2005	—	—	—	—	—	—	15	—	—	—		Intensive Care
"Advertising Space"	2005	8	17	8	14	10	20	5	32	11	9		Intensive Care
"Sin Sin Sin"	2006	22	26	15	46	18	23	9	—	45	16		Intensive Care
"Rudebox"	2006	4	13	5	31	1	17	4	—	16	1		Rudebox
"Kiss Me"	2006	— (Note: "Kiss Me" did not enter the UK Top 100, but peaked at number 84 on the UK Singles Downloads Chart.)	—	—	—	—	—	—	—	56	—		Rudebox
"Lovelight"	2006	8	25	26	—	21	28	8	—	23	25		Rudebox
"Bongo Bong and Je ne t'aime plus"	2007	—	—	—	—	—	—	—	—	—	77		Rudebox
"She's Madonna" (featuring Pet Shop Boys)	2007	16	—	14	—	4	38	2	—	20	8	BVMI: Gold	Rudebox
"Close My Eyes" (vs. Sander van Doorn)	2009	—	—	—	—	33	—	7	—	—	—		Non-album single
"Bodies"	2009	2	4	1	8	1	3	1	30	4	1	BPI: Silver; ARIA: Gold; BVMI: Platinum; IFPI SWI: Platinum	Reality Killed the Video Star
"You Know Me"	2009	6	33	25	—	26	22	10	—	35	51	BPI: Silver	Reality Killed the Video Star
"Morning Sun"	2010	45	—	57	—	32	—	19	—	—	—		Reality Killed the Video Star
"Shame" (with Gary Barlow)	2010	2	62	20	—	11	8	10	—	24	19	BPI: Silver	In and Out of Consciousness: Greatest Hits 1990–2010
"Candy"	2012	1	59	4	14	3	2	3	18	42	8	BPI: 2× Platinum; BVMI: Gold; IFPI AUT: Gold; IFPI SWI: Gold; RMNZ: Gold	Take the Crown
"Different"	2012	64	—	37	—	31	31	— (Note: "Different" did not enter the Dutch Top 40, but peaked at number seven on the Dutch Tipparade chart, which acts as an extension to the Dutch Top 40.)	—	—	—		Take the Crown
"Be a Boy"	2013	—	—	—	—	—	—	—	— (Note: "Be a Boy" did not enter the Dutch Top 40, but peaked at number 12 on the Dutch Tipparade chart, which acts as an extension to the Dutch Top 40.)	—	—		Take the Crown
"Go Gentle"	2013	10	—	29	—	16	28	— (Note: "Go Gentle" did not enter the Dutch Top 40, but peaked at number 5 on the Dutch Tipparade chart, which acts as an extension to the Dutch Top 40.)	—	—	22	BPI: Silver	Swings Both Ways
"Dream a Little Dream" (Note: The version of "Dream a Little Dream" that appears on Swings Both Ways, featuring vocals from Lily Allen, charted in several territories prior to its single release, which does not feature her vocals.)	2013	144	—	—	160	88	—	—	—	—	67		Swings Both Ways
"Shine My Shoes"	2014	89	—	—	—	—	—	—	—	—	—		Swings Both Ways
"Party Like a Russian"	2016	68	—	39	66	72	—	—	—	—	45		The Heavy Entertainment Show
"Love My Life"	2016	22	36	18	—	17	—	—	—	—	8	BPI: Gold; BVMI: Gold; IFPI SWI: Gold	The Heavy Entertainment Show
"Mixed Signals"	2017	— (Note: "Mixed Signals" did not enter the UK Top 100, but peaked at number 85 on the UK Official Singles Downloads Chart.)	—	—	—	—	—	—	—	—	—		The Heavy Entertainment Show
"Time for Change"	2019	— (Note: "Time for Change" did not enter the UK Top 100, but peaked at number 87 on the UK Official Singles Downloads Chart.)	—	—	—	89	—	—	—	—	—		The Christmas Present
"Hey Tiger!"	2019	— (Note: "Hey Tiger" did not enter the UK Top 100, but peaked at number 89 on the UK Singles Downloads Chart.)	—	—	—	—	—	—	—	—	—		The Tiger Who Came to Tea (Original Film Soundtrack)
"Strange Days" (with The Struts)	2020	—	—	—	—	—	—	—	—	—	—		Strange Days
"Can't Stop Christmas"	2020	— (Note: "Can't Stop Christmas" did not enter the UK Top 100, but peaked at number 9 on the UK Official Singles Downloads Chart.)	—	71	—	59	—	—	—	19	—		The Christmas Present
"Angels (XXV)"	2022	— (Note: "Angels (XXV)" did not enter the UK Top 100, but peaked at number 74 on the UK Official Singles Sales Chart.)	—	—	—	—	—	—	—	—	—		XXV
"Lost (XXV)"	2022	— (Note: "Lost (XXV)" did not enter the UK Top 100, but peaked at number 25 on the UK Official Singles Downloads Chart.)	—	—	—	—	—	—	—	—	—		XXV
"Forbidden Road"	2024	— (Note: "Forbidden Road" did not enter the UK Singles Chart Top 100, but peaked at number 20 on the UK Singles Downloads Chart.)	—	—	—	—	—	—	—	—	—		Better Man (Original Motion Picture Soundtrack)
"Rocket" (with Tony Iommi)	2025	— (Note: "Rocket" did not enter the UK Singles Chart, but peaked at number 34 UK Singles Downloads and number 36 on the UK Singles Sales charts.)	—	—	—	—	—	—	—	—	—		Britpop
"Desire" (Official FIFA Anthem) (with Laura Pausini)	2025	— (Note: "Desire" did not enter the UK Singles Chart, but peaked at number 85 on the UK Singles Downloads and number 91 on the UK Singles Sales charts.)	—	—	—	—	—	—	—	—	—		Britpop (Deluxe Edition)
"Spies"	2025	—	—	—	—	—	—	—	—	—	—		Britpop
"Human" (with Jesse & Joy)	2025	—	—	—	—	—	—	—	—	—	—		Britpop
"Pretty Face"	2025	— (Note: "Pretty Face" did not enter the UK Singles Chart, but peaked at number 14 on the UK Singles Downloads and number 17 on the UK Singles Sales charts.)	—	—	—	—	—	—	—	—	—		Britpop
"All My Life"	2026	— (Note: "All My Life" did not enter the UK Singles Chart, but peaked at number 44 on the UK Singles Downloads and number 50 on the UK Singles Sales charts.)	—	—	—	—	—	—	—	—	—		Britpop
"Beauty In Us" (with Miss Monique)	2026	— (Note: "Beauty In Us" did not enter the UK Singles Chart, but debuted at number 79 on the UK Singles Sales Chart.)	—	—	—	—	—	—	—	—	—		Non-album single
"—" denotes a recording that did not chart or was not released in that territory.

=== As featured artist ===
List of singles as featured artist, with selected chart positions and certifications, showing year released and album name
Title	Year	Peak chart positions										Certifications	Album
Title	Year	UK	AUS	AUT	FRA	GER	IRL	NLD	NZ	SWE	SWI	Certifications	Album
"My Culture" (1 Giant Leap featuring Maxi Jazz and Robbie Williams)	2002	9	30	—	—	69	24	33	26	—	51		1 Giant Leap
"Do They Know It's Christmas?" (with Band Aid 20)	2004	1	9	15	72	7	1	4	1	2	7	BPI: 2× Platinum	Non-album singles
"Everybody Hurts" (Note: "Everybody Hurts" did not enter the Dutch Top 40, but peaked at number 5 on the Dutch Tipparade chart, which acts as an extension to the Dutch Top 40.) (as part of Helping Haiti)	2010	1	28	23	—	16	1	45	17	21	16		Non-album singles
"Three Lions 2010" (as part of The Squad)	2010	21	—	—	—	—	—	—	—	—	—		England: The Album 2010
"He Ain't Heavy, He's My Brother" (with The Justice Collective)	2012	1	—	—	—	—	4	—	—	—	—		Non-album single
"Goin' Crazy" (Dizzee Rascal featuring Robbie Williams)	2013	5	—	57	—	32	25	—	—	—	—		The Fifth
"The Days" (Avicii, featuring uncredited vocals by Robbie Williams)	2014	82	10	3	52	7	18	8	6	1	2	ARIA: 2× Platinum; IFPI SWE: Platinum	The Days / Nights and Stories
"Carry On (Shitty City)" (Kai Elle featuring Robbie Williams)	2015	—	—	—	—	—	—	—	—	—	—		Non-album singles
"Bridge over Troubled Water" (as part of Artists for Grenfell)	2017	1	53	—	—	—	—	—	— (Note: "Bridge over Troubled Water" did not enter the NZ Top 40 Singles Chart, but peaked at number four on the NZ Heatseekers Singles Chart.)	—	—	BPI: Gold	Non-album singles
"Electrico Romantico" (Bob Sinclar featuring Robbie Williams)	2019	—	—	—	—	—	—	—	—	—	—		Non-album singles
"Stop Crying Your Heart Out" (as BBC Radio 2 Allstars)	2020	7	—	—	—	—	—	—	—	—	—		Non-album singles
"Une Tahitienne á Paris" (Mareva Galanter featuring Robbie Williams)	2023	—	—	—	—	—	—	—	—	—	—		Non-album singles
"Punk's Dead" (Soft Play, featuring uncredited vocals by Robbie Williams)	2023	—	—	—	—	—	—	—	—	—	—		Heavy Jelly
"Sober" (Lucy Spraggan featuring Robbie Williams)	2024	— (Note: "Sober" did not enter the UK Singles Chart, but debuted at number 58 on the UK Singles Downloads Chart.)	—	—	—	—	—	—	—	—	—		Other Sides Of The Moon
"Danny" (Noga Erez featuring Robbie Williams)	2024	—	—	—	—	—	—	—	—	—	—		The Vandalist
"We Made It Look Easy" (Bon Jovi featuring Robbie Williams)	2025	—	—	—	—	—	—	—	—	—	—		Forever (Legendary Edition)
"Fucked Up" (Reverend and the Makers featuring Robbie Williams)	2026	—	—	—	—	—	—	—	—	—	—		Is This How Happiness Feels?
"—" denotes a recording that did not chart or was not released in that territory.

=== Promotional singles ===
List of promotional singles, showing year released and album name
Title	Year	Albums
"Karma Killer"	1998	I've Been Expecting You
"United"	2000	single release
"My Way" (live)	2001	Live at the Albert
"Mack the Knife"	2001	Swing When You're Winning
"Hot Fudge" (live)	2003	Live at Knebworth
"Last Days of Disco" (Remixes)	2010	Non-album single
"Heart and I"	2011	In and Out of Consciousness: Greatest Hits 1990–2010
"Eternity (XXV)"/ "The Road to Mandalay (XXV)"	2022	XXV
"Pocket Rocket"	2025	Britpop

== Other charted songs ==
List of songs, with selected chart positions, showing year released and album name
Title	Year	Peak chart positions						Album
Title	Year	UK	AUS	AUT	GER	NZ Hot	SWE Heat.	Album
"Do You Mind"	2010	—	98	—	—	—	—	Reality Killed the Video Star
"I Wan'na Be Like You" (featuring Olly Murs)	2013	78	—	55	85	—	—	Swings Both Ways
"Merry Xmas Everybody" (featuring Jamie Cullum)	2019	—	—	—	—	33	17	The Christmas Present
"Christmas (Baby Please Come Home)" (featuring Bryan Adams)	2019	—	—	—	—	34	3	The Christmas Present
"—" denotes a recording that did not chart or was not released in that territory.

== Guest appearances ==
List of non-single guest appearances, with other performing artists, showing year released and album name
Title	Year	Other artist(s)	Album
"Ev'ry Time We Say Goodbye"	1997	none	Come Again
"I Started a Joke"	1998	The Orb	Gotta Get a Message to You
"Are You Gonna Go My Way"	1999	Sir Tom Jones	Reload
"There Are Bad Times Just Around the Corner"	1999	none	Twentieth-Century Blues: The Songs of Noël Coward
"I Wouldn't Normally Do This Kind of Thing"	1999	none	Friends Again
"Surface Noise"	2000	Sound 5	No Illicit Dancing
"That Old Black Magic"	2000	Jane Horrocks	The Further Adventures of Little Voice
"Sweet Gene Vincent"	2001	The Blockheads	Brand New Boots and Panties
"We Are the Champions"	2001	Queen	A Knight's Tale soundtrack
"Have You Met Miss Jones?"	2002	none	Bridget Jones's Diary: Music from the Motion Picture
"Not of This Earth"	2002	none	Bridget Jones's Diary: Music from the Motion Picture
"You're the Why"	2002	Ian Dury & the Blockheads	Ten More Turnips from the Tip
"Beyond the Sea"	2003	none	Finding Nemo soundtrack
"A Man for All Seasons"	2003	none	Johnny English soundtrack
"It's De-Lovely"	2004	none	De-Lovely soundtrack
"Jealousy" (live)	2006	Pet Shop Boys	Concrete
"The Only One I Know"	2007	Mark Ronson	Version
"Please Don't Talk About Me When I'm Gone"	2007	Dean Martin	Forever Cool
"Lola"	2007	none	Radio 1 Established 1967
"More to Life"	2009	Mams Taylor	The R-Evolution of Runk
"Collision of Worlds"	2011	Brad Paisley	Cars 2 soundtrack
"I.L.M.P."	2012	Chris Moyles	The Difficult Second Album
"Charity Song"	2012	Chris Moyles, Davina McCall, Pixie Lott, Olly Murs, Gary Barlow, Ed Sheeran, Danny O'Donoghue, James Corden, Ricky Wilson	The Difficult Second Album
"Muñequita Linda (Te Quiero Dijiste)"	2012	Thalía	Habítame Siempre
"Let's Go All the Way"	2013	The Wondergirls, Ashley Hamilton	Iron Man 3: Heroes Fall —Music Inspired by the Motion Picture
"Good Day Sunshine"	2016	The Beat Bugs	Beat Bugs: Best of Seasons 1 & 2
"Everybody Wants to Rule the World"	2018	Trevor Horn featuring the Sarm Orchestra	Reimagines the Eighties
"2 Become 1"	2019	Emma Bunton	My Happy Place
"The Big Goodbye"	2020	Ronan Keating	Twenty Twenty
"If I Don't Cry" (demo)	2020	Royal Shakespeare Company	The Boy in the Dress (Original Cast Recording)
"A House Without a Mum" (demo)	2020	Royal Shakespeare Company	The Boy in the Dress (Original Cast Recording)
"We Made It Look Easy"	2025	Bon Jovi	Forever (Legendary Edition)

== As Lufthaus ==
=== Albums ===
List of albums as Lufthaus, with selected details
Title	Details	Peak chart positions
Title	Details	UK Dig.
Visions, Vol. 1	Released: 6 October 2023; Label: Armada	94

=== Singles ===
List of singles as Lufthaus, showing year released and album name
Title	Year	Album
"Sway"	2022	Visions, Vol. 1
"To the Light"	2022	Visions, Vol. 1
"Soul Seekers"	2022	Visions, Vol. 1
"Unlovable"	2023	Visions, Vol. 1
"Ringo"	2023	Visions, Vol. 1
"Alcohol"	2023	Visions, Vol. 1
"Immortal" (with Sophie Ellis-Bextor)	2023	Visions, Vol. 1
"Where Do We Come From" (with Don Diablo and Sofiya Nzau)	2024	Non-album single

== See also ==
- Robbie Williams videography
- Take That discography
