= Under the Radar =

Under the Radar, a phrase describing a person or activity that goes unnoticed, may also refer to:

== Albums ==
- Under the Radar (Daniel Powter album), 2008
- Under the Radar (Dispatch album), 2002
- Under the Radar (Grade album), 1999
- Under the Radar (Little Feat album), 1998
- Under the Radar Volume 1, by Robbie Williams, 2014
- Under the Radar Volume 2, by Robbie Williams, 2017
- Under the Radar Volume 3, by Robbie Williams, 2019
- Under the Radar, by Lil Zane, 2005 (unreleased)
- Under the Radar, by Taylor Hicks, 2005

== Film and television ==
- Under the Radar (film), a 2004 Australian comedy
- "Under the Radar" (NCIS), a 2013 TV episode
- "Under the Radar" (White Collar), a 2011 TV episode

== Other uses ==
- Under the Radar (magazine), an American music magazine
- Under the Radar Festival, a theater festival in New York City

== See also ==
- Flying Under the Radar, an album by the Kentucky Headhunters, 2006
- Underneath the Radar, an album by Underworld, 1988
  - "Underneath the Radar" (song), the title song
