= List of awards and nominations received by Robbie Williams =

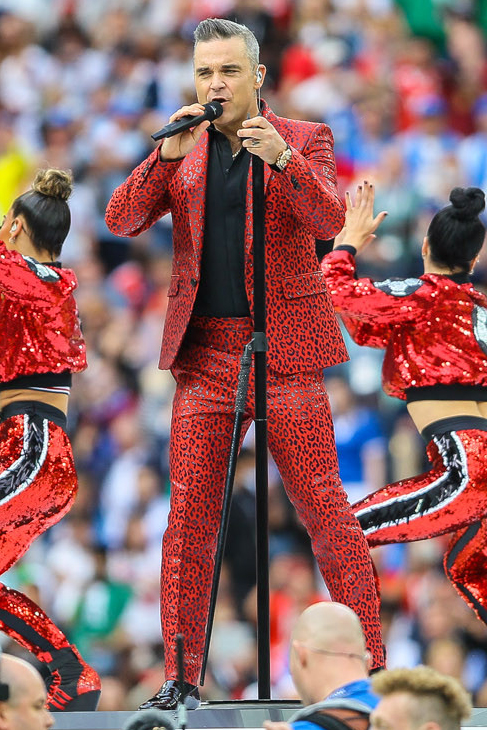
Robbie Williams in 2018

English pop singer Robbie Williams has won several awards throughout his successful solo career, including:

- More Brit Awards than any other artist in music history, a record 18.
- More Echo Music Prize Awards than any other artist ever, a record 12.

== Ivor Novello Awards ==
Year	Nominee / work	Award	Result
1998	"Angels"	Best Song Musically And Lyrically	Nominated
1999	"Angels"	Most Performed Work	Won
1999	Himself	Songwriter of the Year	Won
2000	"Strong"	Best Song Musically And Lyrically	Won
2000	"Strong"	Most Performed Work	Nominated
2001	"Rock DJ"	Most Performed Work	Nominated
2003	"Feel"	International Hit of the Year	Nominated
2004	"Feel"	International Hit of the Year	Nominated
2005	"Angels"	Song of the Decade (1995-2004)	Won
2007	"Rudebox"	International Hit of the Year	Nominated
2012	Take That	PRS for Music Outstanding Contribution to British Music	Won
2025	Himself	PRS for Music Icon	Won

== Brit Awards ==
The Brit Awards are the British Phonographic Industry's annual popular music awards.

Year	Nominee / work	Award	Result
1993	"Could It Be Magic"	British Single of the Year	Won
1993	"It Only Takes a Minute"	British Single of the Year	Nominated
1993	"A Million Love Songs"	British Single of the Year	Nominated
1993	Take That	British Breakthrough Act	Nominated
1994	"Pray"	British Single of the Year	Won
1994	"Pray"	British Video of the Year	Won
1994	Take That	British Group	Nominated
1996	"Back for Good"	British Single of the Year	Won
1996	"Back for Good"	British Video of the Year	Nominated
1998	"Old Before I Die"	British Single of the Year	Nominated
1998	Robbie Williams	British Male Solo Artist	Nominated
1999	I've Been Expecting You	British Album of the Year	Nominated
1999	"Angels"	British Single of the Year	Won
1999	"Millennium"	British Single of the Year	Nominated
1999	"Millennium"	British Video of the Year	Won
1999	"Let Me Entertain You"	British Video of the Year	Nominated
1999	Robbie Williams	British Male Solo Artist	Won
2000	"She's the One"	British Single of the Year	Won
2000	"She's the One"	British Video of the Year	Won
2001	Sing When You're Winning	British Album of the Year	Nominated
2001	"Rock DJ"	British Single of the Year	Won
2001	"Rock DJ"	British Video of the Year	Won
2001	Robbie Williams	British Male Solo Artist	Won
2002	"Eternity/The Road to Mandalay"	British Single of the Year	Nominated
2002	"Kids" (With Kylie Minogue)	British Video of the Year	Nominated
2002	"Supreme"	British Video of the Year	Nominated
2002	Robbie Williams	British Male Solo Artist	Won
2003	Robbie Williams	British Male Solo Artist	Won
2005	"Do They Know It's Christmas?"	British Single of the Year	Nominated
2005	"Angels"	British Song of Twenty Five Years	Won
2006	Robbie Williams	British Male Solo Artist	Nominated
2007	Robbie Williams	British Live Act	Nominated
2010	"The Beatles Medley" (With Take That)	Live Performance of Thirty Years	Nominated
2010	"The Full Monty Medley" (With Tom Jones)	Live Performance of Thirty Years	Nominated
2010	Robbie Williams	British Male Solo Artist	Nominated
2010	Robbie Williams	Outstanding Contribution to Music	Honored
2011	Progress	British Album of the Year	Nominated
2011	Take That	British Group	Won
2013	"Candy"	British Single of the Year	Nominated
2017	Robbie Williams	Icon Award	Honored

== GAFFA Awards ==
=== GAFFA Awards (Denmark) ===
Delivered since 1991, the GAFFA Awards are a Danish award that rewards popular music by the magazine of the same name. Williams has received one award out of seven nominations.

Year	Nominee / work	Award	Result	Ref.
1998	Himself	Foreign Male Act	Nominated	
1998	Himself	Foreign Live Name	Nominated	
2000	Himself	Best Foreign Male Act	Nominated	
2001	Himself	Foreign Male Act	Won	
2001	Himself	Foreign Live Name	Nominated	
2002	Himself	Best Foreign Male Act	Nominated	
2004	What We Did Last Summer	Best Foreign DVD	Nominated	

== GQ Men of the Year ==
The GQ is an international monthly men's magazine based in New York City and founded in 1931.

Year	Nominee / work	Award	Result
1998	Robbie Williams	Solo Artist of the Year	Won
2001	Robbie Williams	Solo Artist of the Year	Won
2012	Robbie Williams	Icon of the Year	Won

== Grammy Awards ==
The Grammy Award is an award presented by The Recording Academy to recognize achievement in the mainly English-language music industry.

Year	Nominee / work	Award	Result
2003	"My Culture" (With 1 Giant Leap & Maxi Jazz)	Best Music Video (Director: Hamish Hamilton)	Nominated
2003	Robbie Williams: Live at the Albert	Best Music Film (Director: Tim Hope)	Nominated

== Italian Music Awards ==
The Italian Music Awards were an accolade established in 2001 by the Federazione Industria Musicale Italiana to recognize the achievements in the Italian music industry both by domestic and international artists.

Year	Nominee / work	Award	Result
2001	Robbie Williams	Best International Male Artist	Nominated
2002	Robbie Williams	Best International Male Artist	Nominated
2003	Robbie Williams	Best International Male Artist	Won

== Los Premios MTV Latinoamérica ==
The Los Premios MTV Latinoamérica was the Latin America version of the MTV Video Music Award.

Year	Nominee / work	Award	Result
2003	Robbie Williams	Best Pop Artist — International	Nominated
2006	Robbie Williams	Best Pop Artist — International	Won

== Mercury Prize ==
The Mercury Prize is an annual music prize awarded for the best album from the United Kingdom and Ireland.

Year	Nominee / work	Award	Result
1994	Everything Changes	Mercury Music Prize	Shortlisted
1998	Life thru a Lens	Mercury Music Prize	Shortlisted

== MTV Asia Awards ==
The MTV Asia Awards is the Asian equivalent of the MTV Europe Music Award.

Year	Nominee / work	Award	Result
2002	Robbie Williams	Favorite Male Artist	Nominated
2003	Robbie Williams	Favorite Male Artist	Won
2004	Robbie Williams	Favorite Male Artist	Nominated
2005	Robbie Williams	Favorite Male Artist	Nominated
2006	Robbie Williams	Favorite Male Artist	Nominated

== MTV Europe Music Award ==
The MTV Europe Music Award is an award presented by Viacom International Media Networks Europe to honor artists and music in popular culture.

Year	Nominee / work	Award	Result
1994	Take That	Best Group	Won
1995	Take That	Best Live Act	Won
1998	Life thru a Lens	Best Album	Nominated
1998	"Angels"	Best Song	Nominated
1998	Robbie Williams	Best Male	Won
1999	Robbie Williams	Best Male	Nominated
2000	"Rock DJ"	Best Song	Won
2000	"Rock DJ"	Best Video	Nominated
2000	Robbie Williams	Best Male	Nominated
2000	Robbie Williams	Best Pop	Nominated
2000	Robbie Williams	Best UK & Ireland Act	Nominated
2001	"Supreme"	Best Video	Nominated
2001	Robbie Williams	Best Male	Won
2002	Robbie Williams	Best Male	Nominated
2003	Escapology	Best Album	Nominated
2003	Robbie Williams	Best Male	Nominated
2003	Robbie Williams	Best Pop	Nominated
2004	Robbie Williams	Best Male	Nominated
2004	Robbie Williams	Best Pop	Nominated
2005	Robbie Williams	Best Male	Won
2005	Robbie Williams	Best Pop	Nominated
2006	Robbie Williams	Best Male	Nominated
2006	Robbie Williams	Best Pop	Nominated
2009	Robbie Williams	Best Male	Nominated
2017	For the Artists for Grenfell initiative	Power of Music Award	Won

== MTV Video Music Award ==
The MTV Video Music Award is an award presented by the cable channel MTV to honor the best in the music video medium.

Year	Nominee / work	Award	Result
1994	"Babe"	International Viewer's Choice Award for MTV Europe	Won
2001	"Rock DJ"	Best Male Video	Nominated
2001	"Rock DJ"	Breakthrough Video	Nominated
2001	"Rock DJ"	Best Visual Effects	Won

== NME Awards ==
The NME Awards are annual music awards show founded by the music magazine NME.

Year	Nominee / work	Award	Result
2002	Himself	Best Pop Act	Nominated
2003	Himself	Worst Style	Nominated
2003	Escapology	Worst Album	Won
2003	"Feel"	Worst Single	Won
2006	Himself	Worst Style	Nominated
2007	Rudebox	Worst Album	Won

== Pollstar Concert Industry Awards ==
The Pollstar Concert Industry Awards aim to reward the best in the business of shows and concerts.

Year	Nominee / work	Award	Result
2000	Himself	Best New Artist Tour	Nominated
2000	1999 Tour	Club Tour of the Year	Nominated

== Popjustice 20 Quid Music Prize ==
The Popjustice £20 Music Prize, also known as the Popjustice Twenty Quid Prize, is an annual prize awarded by music website Popjustice to recognise the best British pop single of the previous year. The prize was conceived by Popjustice founder Peter Robinson in 2003 as a reaction to what he perceived as the pompous and elitist nature of the existing Mercury Prize, which recognises the best album of the previous year, and in particular its exclusion of pop music acts in favour of those from more esoteric genres. The shortlist for the Popjustice prize is announced in September of each year and the winner named the following month, to coincide with the presentation of the Mercury Prize. Popjustice gives a token prize of £20 to the winner of its award, in contrast to the £20,000 given to the winner of the Mercury Prize.

Year	Nominee / work	Award	Result
2005	"Radio"	Best British Pop Single	Nominated
2007	"She's Madonna"	Best British Pop Single	Nominated
2013	"Candy"	Best British Pop Single	Nominated

== UK Music Video Awards ==
The UK Music Video Awards is an annual award ceremony founded in 2008 to recognise creativity, technical excellence and innovation in music videos and moving images for music.

Year	Nominee / work	Award	Result
2010	"You Know Me"	Best Art Direction	Nominated
2013	"Goin' Crazy"	Best Art Direction	Nominated
2013	"Goin' Crazy"	Best Pop Video (UK)	Nominated

== ZD Awards ==
Zvukovaya Dorozhka (Russian: Звуковая Дорожка, "sound track") is Russia's oldest hit parade in field of popular music. Since 2003 it is presented in a ceremony in concert halls. It's considered one of the major Russian music awards.

Year	Nominee / work	Award	Result	Ref.
2015	Let Me Entertain You Tour (live at Olimpiysky)	Tour of the Year	Won	

== Žebřík Music Awards ==
Year	Nominee / work	Award	Result	Ref.
2000	"Rock DJ"	Best International Video	Nominated	
2001	Himself	Best International Male	Nominated	
2002	Himself	Best International Male	Nominated	
2002	"Feel"	Best International Song	Nominated	
2003	Himself	Best International Male	Won	
2003	Himself	Best International Personality	Nominated	
2004	Himself	Best International Personality	Nominated	
2004	Himself	Best International Male	Nominated	
2004	"Radio"	Best International Song	Nominated	
2005	Himself	Best International Male	Won	
2005	Himself	Best International Personality	Nominated	
2005	Himself	Best International Průser	Nominated	
2005	Intensive Care	Best International Album	Nominated	
2005	"Tripping"	Best International Song	Nominated	
2005	"Tripping"	Best International Video	Nominated	
2006	"Lovelight"	Best International Video	Nominated	
2006	Himself	Best International Male	Nominated	
2007	Himself	Best International Male	Nominated	
2008	Himself	Best International Male	Nominated	
2009	Himself	Best International Male	Nominated	
2009	Reality Killed the Video Star	Best International Album	Nominated	
2009	"Bodies"	Best International Song	Nominated	
2009	"Bodies"	Best International Video	Nominated	
2010	Himself	Best International Male	Won	
2012	Himself	Best International Male	Nominated	
2012	"Candy"	Best International Song	Won	
2017	Himself	Best International Male	Nominated	
2017	Himself	Best International Live	Nominated	

== 1996 ==
- Smash Hits Awards [UK]: Funniest Person In The World #1
- TV Hits Poll [UK]: Funniest Person Number #1

== 1997 ==
- The Sun Newspaper [UK]: Best Male Singer

== 1998 ==
- Nordorff Robbins Silver Clef Awards [UK]: Best Newcomer
- The London Awards [UK]: Best Male Vocalist
- TMF Awards [NL]: Best Male Singer
- The Sun Newspaper [UK]: Best Album - I've Been Expecting You, Best Live Act, Best Male Singer
- Hit Radio FM 99.7 Music Award [Hong Kong]: Best International Male Singer
- Maaraiv Lanoar and Channel 1 Award [Israel]: Best Male Single Of The Year
- Cable YMC Award [Hong Kong]: Best International Male
- Musikexpress [D]: Best Solo Artist of 1998
- Smash Hits Awards [UK]: Best Male Solo Star #1
- Sky Magazine [UK]: Action Man Of The Year

== 1999 ==
- The 12th Headlines Readers Poll Awards [Hong Kong]: Best Male #1, Best Songs "Millennium", Best Album "I've Been Expecting You", Best Video "Millennium"
- Smash Hits Awards [UK]: Best Male Solo Star #1
- Melody Maker's Readers' Poll [UK]: Best Male Solo Singer, Fool Of The Year
- Top Of The Pops [UK]: Best Male Solo Artist
- New Musical Express Premier Awards [UK]: Best Solo Artist
- "Company" Magazine [UK]: Most sexiest male of the planet
- "Cosmopolitan” Magazine [UK]: Most sexiest male of all
- "PlayStation" Magazine [UK]: Most popular icon of 20th century

== 2000 ==
- Capital Radio Awards [UK]: Best Male Solo Artist, Best British [Single "She's The One", Best *British Video "She's The One"
- "Company" Magazine [UK]: Most sexiest male of the planet
- Q Awards (Magazine Q) [UK]: Best Songwriter

== 2001 ==
- NRJ Music Awards [F]: Nominations for: Best artist international, Best website
- Capital Awards [UK]: Best album "Sing When You're Winning"
- "Company" Magazine [UK]: Most sexiest male of the planet

== 2002 ==
- Echo Awards [D]: Best male artist international
- Edison Award [NL]: Best male artist international "Swing when you're winning"
- Hong Kong Top Sales Music Awards [HK]: Top 10 Best Selling Foreign Albums "Swing When You're Winning"

== 2003 ==
- NRJ Radio Awards [S]: Best International Male Artist
- NRJ Radio Awards [S]: Best Pop "Feel"
- NRJ Music Awards [F]: Nominations For: Best Male International
- NRJ Music Awards [F]: Nominations For: Best Song: "Feel"
- Echo Awards [D]: Best International Male Artist
- TMF Awards Nederland: Best Male
- TMF Awards Nederland: Best Videoclip: "Feel"
- TMF Awards Nederland: Best Single: "Feel"
- Amadeus Music Awards [A]: Best International Artist Of The Year
- Lycra British Style Awards [UK]: Most Elegant Male Artist
- Q Awards [Magazine Q] [UK]: Best Live Act
- Edison Award [NL]: Best Male Artist International "Escapology"
- Oye! Award [Mexico]: Best Album By A Solo Male - International Category For "Escapology"

== 2004 ==
- Echo Awards [D]: Best male international
- Echo Awards [D]: Best Music-DVD
- TMF Awards [NL]: Best male international
- Nordic Music Award [N]: Special award of honor for being one of the best selling artists in *Denmark, Sweden and Norway
- Music Hall of fame [UK]: award for 'Induction for 1990's'
- Edison Award [NL]: Best male artist international "Live Summer 2003"
- Oye Award [Mexico]: Most sold records by an international Artist
- Hong Kong Top Sales Music Awards [HK]: Top 10 Best Selling Foreign Albums "Greatest Hits"

== 2005 ==
- Echo Awards [D]: Best male international
- RAFT Award [UK] : Best male, best live act
- Oye! Award [Mexico]: Most sold records by an international Artist
- Oye! Award [Mexico]: International Song of the Year, "Radio"
- Hong Kong Top Sales Music Awards [HK]: Top 10 Best Selling Foreign Albums "Intensive Care"

== 2006 ==
- NRJ Music Awards [F]: Best male international
- D.I.V.A. [D] : German Music Award
- Echo Award [D]: Best male international
- Hong Kong Top Sales Music Awards [HK]: Top 10 Best Selling Foreign Albums "Rudebox"

== 2007 ==
- Echo Award [D]: Best International Male
- Echo Award [D]: Best Music-DVD
- Oye! Award [Mexico]: International Song of the Year, "Rudebox"

== 2010 ==
- Echo Award [D]: Best International Male
- NRJ Music Awards [F]: Best International Male Artist
- Virgin Media Awards: Best Male Artist
- Q Award for Best Collaboration song ("Shame" with Gary Barlow)

== 2011 ==
- Echo Award [D] - Best International Group (with Take That)
- Flecking Awards - Nomination for Most Stylish Male

== 2012 ==
- Virgin Media Awards - Hottest Male
- Virgin Media Awards - Best Live Act (with Take That)
- The 4Music Video Honours - Best Video "Candy"
- The Sun Newspaper - Best male international

== 2013 ==
- ECHO Award - Best international pop/rock artist
- Q Awards - Q Idol
- Heart FM - Live Artist Of The Year
- Bambi Awards - Entertainment

== 2014 ==
- ECHO Award - Best international pop/rock artist
- Artist and Manager Awards - Artists

== 2016 ==
- Bambi Awards - International Music

== 2019 ==
- National Television Awards: Nomination for TV Judge (for The X Factor)

== 2020 ==
- The Stage Debut Awards - Best Composer or Lyricist (for The Boy in the Dress)
