= Under the Radar Volume 1 =

Compilation album by Robbie Williams
- Released: 8 December 2014
- Recorded: 1997–2013
- Length: 55:33
- Label: Self-released
- Producer: Guy Chambers; Tim Metcalfe; Flynn Francis; WTTNS; Richard Flack; Jeremy Meehan; Daft Dog; Candy Flip

Robbie Williams chronology
Swings Both Ways (2013)	Under the Radar Volume 1 (2014)	The Heavy Entertainment Show (2016)

Singles from Under the Radar Volume 1
- 1. "H.E.S." Released: 5 December 2014

Under the Radar Volume 1 is a compilation album by English singer Robbie Williams, comprising demos, B-sides and rarities. It was released exclusively through Williams' website on 1 December 2014.

== Release ==
Williams announced the album on 28 November 2014, when it was made available for pre-order exclusively through RobbieWilliams.com. The album was officially released in CD format three days later, on 1 December 2014, with a digital edition following on 8 December 2014.

The opening song "Bully" was released for free on 1 December to Williams' fans, presented by Café Royal, who promoted it on the same day in the brand's first television advert as part of the campaign "In the service of good taste".

== Recording ==
"The Brits" was written and recorded over the course of two days in February 2013 and was released as a free demo through Williams' website. It was written as a nod to the awards ceremony.

== Volume 2 ==
On 11 July 2017, Williams announced that the follow-up to the album, Under the Radar Volume 2, would be released in November of that year and was available to pre-order from his official website.

== Track listing ==
Under the Radar Volume 1 track listing
No.	Title	Writer(s)	Producer(s)	Length
1.	"Bully"	Robbie Williams; Tim Metcalfe; Flynn Francis	Metcalfe; Francis	3:21
2.	"Raver"	Williams; Metcalfe; Francis	Metcalfe; Francis	3:54
3.	"H.E.S."	Williams; Metcalfe; Francis	WTNSS	3:38
4.	"The Edge"	Williams; Guy Chambers; Chris Heath	Chambers; Richard Flack	4:07
5.	"All Climb On"	Williams; Chambers	Chambers; Flack	4:35
6.	"Surrender"	Williams; Metcalfe; Francis	Metcalfe; Francis	4:06
7.	"Love Is You"	Williams; Jeremy Meehan	Meehan	3:44
8.	"The Cure"	Williams; Chambers; Heath	Chambers; Flack	4:09
9.	"The Pilot"	Williams; Chambers; Heath; Nozuka	Chambers; Flack	3:50
10.	"The Brits"	Williams; Chambers	Chambers	4:49
11.	"National Treasure"	Williams; Chambers; Heath	Chambers; Flack	4:26
12.	"Super Tony"	Williams; Kelvin Andrews; Daniel Spencer; Richard Scott; Scott Ralph	Daft Dog; Candy Flip	3:23
13.	"Greenlight"	Williams; Metcalfe; Francis	Metcalfe; Francis	3:34
14.	"Bullet"	Williams; Metcalfe; Francis	Metcalfe; Francis	3:51
Total length:				55:33
