= Chris Heath =

British writer

- Born: Evesham, West Midlands, England
- Education: Rugby School, UK; Cambridge University
- Occupations: Writer; journalist

Chris Heath is a British writer and journalist. He was born in Evesham in the West Midlands and attended Rugby School in Warwickshire. He studied social and political science at Cambridge University. Heath was a regular contributor to the popular English music magazine Smash Hits in the 1980s and early 1990s and has subsequently reported on a wide variety of non-fiction topics for GQ, The Atlantic, Esquire, and Vanity Fair; as well as writing a number of books on popular culture. He won the 2013 National Magazine Award for Reporting for his article about the 2011 Zanesville, Ohio animal escape in GQ.

== Work ==
In 1989, Heath travelled with Pet Shop Boys on their first world tour, and the result was the book entitled Pet Shop Boys, Literally, released in 1990. In 1993, he published Pet Shop Boys versus America which was written as he accompanied them on the Performance Tour in the US. He wrote the liner notes to the reissues of the band's first eleven albums. Alongside Pet Shop Boys, he contributed to the commentary track on the 2003 PopArt DVD. He writes and edits the Pet Shop Boys' fan club magazine, also called Literally, and its follow-up, Annually, and conducts interviews for their tour programmes.

He is also the author of the best-selling biography of Robbie Williams, Feel (2004), and its follow-up, Reveal (2017).

He has been a Contributing Editor at Details, Rolling Stone, and American GQ.

In 2019 he co-wrote the lyrics for the musical The Boy in the Dress, which was presented by the Royal Shakespeare Company.

He published an investigation of the Ponary massacre in Lithuania during World War II and its aftermath, No Road Leading Back: An Improbable Escape from the Nazis and the Tangled Way We Tell the Story of the Holocaust, in September 2024. It was selected by the American Library Association as a Notable Book in 2025.

=== Selected articles ===
For GQ:

- "18 Tigers, 17 Lions, 8 Bears, 3 Cougars, 2 Wolves, 1 Baboon, 1 Macaque, and 1 Man Dead in Ohio" (February 2012), for which he won the 2013 National Magazine Award for Reporting
- "Graduation Day" (February 2012), about the 2011 Japanese tsunami
- "The True Story of Gary Faulkner, the Man Who Hunted Osama bin Laden" (September 2010)

For The Atlantic:

- "A Lost Trove of Civil War Gold, an FBI Investigation, and Some Very Angry Treasure Hunters" (June 2022)
- "The Truth Behind the Amazon Mystery Seeds" (July 2021)

For Esquire:

- "The Militiamen, the Governor, and the Kidnapping That Wasn't" (October 2022)

For Smithsonian (magazine):

- "Rifling Through the Archives With Legendary Historian Robert Caro" (March 2025)
