= My Culture =

2002 single by 1 Giant Leap featuring Robbie Williams and Maxi Jazz

Single by 1 Giant Leap featuring Robbie Williams and Maxi Jazz

from the album 1 Giant Leap
- B-side: "Racing Away"
- Released: 8 April 2002
- Length: 5:40 (album version); 3:43 (radio edit)
- Label: Palm Pictures
- Songwriters: Robbie Williams; Maxi Jazz; Jamie Catto; Duncan Bridgeman; Nigel Butler
- Producers: Jamie Catto; Duncan Bridgeman

1 Giant Leap singles chronology
"My Culture" (2002)	"Braided Hair" (2002)

Maxi Jazz singles chronology
"My Culture" (2002)	"Dance4Life" (2006)

Robbie Williams singles chronology
"Mr. Bojangles" / "I Will Talk and Hollywood Will Listen" (2002)	"My Culture" (2002)	"Feel" (2002)

"My Culture" is a song by British trip hop duo 1 Giant Leap released as the first single from their debut album, 1 Giant Leap (2002), on 8 April 2002. The track features vocals from Maxi Jazz and Robbie Williams. The song peaked at No. 9 in the United Kingdom and charted within the top 40 in Australia, Italy, the Netherlands, and New Zealand. The first few lines of Williams' lyrics are the same as a part of the hidden track "Hello Sir" from his debut album, Life thru a Lens (1997).

== Music video ==
The music video starts with a comet crashing into a planet creating a universe and human civilisation as the Earth continues to rapidly evolve further in time. At the end of the video many children from different cultures walk into a building shaped rocket which launches up into space.

== Track listings ==
UK CD single

1. "My Culture" (radio edit)
2. "My Culture" (We Love This mix)
3. "Racing Away" (album version)
4. "My Culture" (enhanced video)

UK 12-inch single

1. "My Culture" (Goldtrix main mix) – 7:23
2. "My Culture" (album version) – 5:30
3. "My Culture" (Mutiny mix) – 7:00

UK cassette single

1. "My Culture" (radio edit)
2. "Racing Away" (album version)

European CD single

1. "My Culture" (radio edit)
2. "My Culture" (We Love This mix)

Australian CD single

1. "My Culture" (radio edit)
2. "My Culture" (We Love This mix)
3. "Racing Away" (album version)

== Charts ==
=== Weekly charts ===
Chart (2002)	Peak position
Australia (ARIA)	30
Belgium (Ultratop 50 Flanders)	50
Belgium (Ultratip Bubbling Under Wallonia)	5
Europe (Eurochart Hot 100)	34
Europe (European Hit Radio)	9
Germany (GfK)	69
Ireland (IRMA)	24
Italy (FIMI)	16
Netherlands (Dutch Top 40)	33
Netherlands (Single Top 100)	42
New Zealand (Recorded Music NZ)	26
Romania (Romanian Top 100)	62
Scottish Singles Sales (Official Charts)	9
Switzerland (Schweizer Hitparade)	51
UK Singles (Official Charts)	9
UK Dance (Official Charts)	18
UK Indie (Official Charts)	2

=== Year-end charts ===
Chart (2002)	Position
Europe (European Hit Radio)	60
UK Singles (OCC)	171

== Release history ==
Region	Date	Format(s)	Label(s)	Ref(s).
United Kingdom	8 April 2002	12-inch vinyl; CD; cassette	Palm Pictures	
Australia	29 April 2002	CD	Festival Mushroom	
New Zealand	27 May 2002	CD	Festival Mushroom	
United States	16 September 2002	Triple A radio	Palm Pictures	
United States	14 October 2002	Contemporary hit; hot adult contemporary radio	Palm Pictures	
