= Songbook (Robbie Williams album) =

Compilation album by Robbie Williams
- Released: 11 October 2009
- Recorded: 1997–2006
- Genre: Britpop, pop rock
- Length: 59:32
- Label: EMI, The Mail on Sunday

Robbie Williams chronology
| Rudebox (2006) | Songbook (2009) | Reality Killed the Video Star (2009) |

Songbook is a compilation album by English pop singer Robbie Williams. It was given away for free inside the Mail on Sunday on 11 October 2009. The one-off, limited-edition album includes some of his biggest hits, several rare live performances, plus images and exclusive clips from his 2009 album, Reality Killed the Video Star. Julian Broad shot the image featured on the cover, which was taken in the same shoot where the image used for the front cover of Reality Killed the Video Star was taken.

== Track listing ==
1. "Let Me Entertain You" (Live from Knebworth)
2. "Feel" (Live from Knebworth)
3. "Come Undone"
4. "Viva Life on Mars"
5. "The Trouble with Me"
6. "Man Machine"
7. "Me and My Monkey"
8. "No Regrets" (Live from Slane Castle)
9. "Phoenix from the Flames"
10. "Nan's Song"
11. "Rock DJ" (Live from Cologne)
12. "Angels" (Live from London Forum)
