= 1 Giant Leap (album) =

Studio album by 1 Giant Leap
- Released: 2 April 2002
- Genre: Trip hop, electronic, world
- Label: Palm Pictures
- Producer: Jamie Catto, Duncan Bridgeman

1 Giant Leap chronology
1 Giant Leap (2002)	What About Me? (2009)

Professional ratings
Review scores
Source	Rating
AllMusic	4/5 stars

1 Giant Leap is the debut album by English electronic music duo 1 Giant Leap. Beginning in October 1999, its two members, Jamie Catto and Duncan Bridgeman, travelled across the world for six months to record vocals and music by various vocalists and musicians from Senegal, Ghana, South Africa, Uganda, India, Nepal, Sikkim, Thailand, Australia, New Zealand, and the United States, before returning to London in March 2000. The album was released on DVD in September 2002.

== Track listing ==
No.	Title	Writer(s)	Length
1.	"Dunya Salam" (featuring Baaba Maal)	Duncan Bridgeman; Jamie Catto; Baaba Maal	2:55
2.	"My Culture" (featuring Robbie Williams and Maxi Jazz)	Bridgeman; Catto; Maxi Jazz; Robbie Williams; Nigel Butler	5:39
3.	"The Way You Dream" (featuring Michael Stipe, Whirimako Black and Asha Bhosle)	Bridgeman; Catto; Michael Stipe	8:20
4.	"Ma' Africa" (featuring The Mahotella Queens and Ulali)	Bridgeman; Catto; Mahotella Queens; Ulali	4:48
5.	"Braided Hair" (featuring Speech and Neneh Cherry)	Bridgeman; Catto; Speech; Neneh Cherry; Ulali	4:03
6.	"Ta Moko" (featuring Whirimako Black)	Bridgeman; Catto; Mako Black	5:09
7.	"Bushes" (featuring Baaba Maal)	Bridgeman; Catto; Maal	6:34
8.	"Passion" (featuring Michael Franti)	Bridgeman; Catto; Franti	5:46
9.	"Daphne" (featuring Eddi Reader, The Mahotella Queens and Revetti Sakalar)	Bridgeman; Catto; Mahotella Queens; Eddi Reader	7:03
10.	"All Alone (On Eilean Shona)"	Bridgeman; Catto; Mahotella Queens	7:50
11.	"Racing Away" (featuring Grant Lee Phillips and Horace Andy)	Bridgeman; Catto; Kaolin Thompson; Grant Lee Phillips; Horace Andy	5:59
12.	"Ghosts" (featuring Eddi Reader)	Bridgeman; Catto; Reader; Tim Booth	6:36

== Personnel ==
=== 1 Giant Leap ===
- Jamie Catto, Duncan Bridgeman – All instruments

=== Vocalists featured ===
- Robbie Williams – vocals
- Maxi Jazz – raps
- Neneh Cherry – vocals
- Michael Stipe – vocals
- Horace Andy – vocals
- Asha Bhosle – vocals
- Baaba Maal – vocals
- Mahotella Queens – vocals
- Grant Lee Phillips – vocals
- Whirimako Black – vocals
- Eddi Reader – vocals
- Ram Dass – spoken word
- Ulali – vocals, spoken word
- Tom Robbins – spoken word
- Kurt Vonnegut, Jr. – spoken word
- Michael Franti – poetry
- Dana Gillespie – chant

=== Other musicians ===
- Dave Randall – guitar
- Nigel Butler – guitar, programming and mixing
- Sanjay Kumar – guitar
- DJ Swamp – turntables
- Ronu Majumdar – flute
- Lévon Minassian – duduk
- Pops Mohamed – percussion, kora, bird calls, effects
- Ayub Ogada – nyatiti
- Eddie Quansah – trumpet
- Bada Seck – djembe, sabar
- Goetz Botzenhardt – mixing engineer
- Tim Clark – executive producer
- Tony Cousins – mastering
- Suzette Newman – executive producer

== Charts ==
Chart	Peak position
Australian Albums (ARIA)	18
New Zealand Albums (RMNZ)	41
UK Albums (OCC)	51
