= 1 Giant Leap =

British electronic music duo

- Origin: London, England
- Genres: Electronic; trip hop; house; world
- Years active: 2001–present
- Label: Palm Pictures
- Members: Jamie Catto; Duncan Bridgeman

1 Giant Leap is a British electronic music duo consisting of the two principal artists, Jamie Catto (Faithless founding member) and Duncan Bridgeman.

== Career ==
Based in the UK, the two musicians set out to create a multimedia project that would encompass a CD, DVD and cinematic presentation that would offer a complete artistic statement. The project offers music, digital video footage shot over the course of six months by Catto and Bridgeman, images, rhythms and spoken word content.

The band was signed to the Palm record label and its eponymous CD was released on 9 April 2002. It features contributions from Dennis Hopper, Kurt Vonnegut, Michael Stipe, Robbie Williams, Eddi Reader, Tom Robbins, Brian Eno, Baaba Maal, Speech, Asha Bhosle, Neneh Cherry, Anita Roddick, Michael Franti, Zap Mama, and other artists and authors. The band's theme for the project is "Unity Through Diversity". A making-of was also shown on the Discovery Channel, which featured some of the effort involved in finding and working with the musicians and other people involved in the project.

1 Giant Leap's "My Culture" video for their first top ten single, featuring Robbie Williams and Maxi Jazz from Faithless, received extensive airplay.

In 2004, they moved on to a deal with Simon Fuller and 19 Entertainment to make a second film and album titled What About Me? The concept was the same as their initial CD and DVD—travelling the world interviewing artists and sampling music—though the second time around their journey was longer (four years) and doubling the number of contributing artists from their debut release.

== Reception ==
In a review for NPR's All Things Considered, Charles deLedesma said that the album and DVD had "an uphill marketing struggle ... because it isn't easily pigeonholed. But that's its real strength, too. This production presents a luscious, cohesive collection of images, ideas and extremely beautiful world music, which flows here with the voices of three continents."

== Discography ==
=== Albums ===
List of albums, with selected details and chart positions
Title	Album details	Peak chart positions		
Title	Album details	UK	AUS	NZ
1 Giant Leap	Released: April 2002; Label: Palm Pictures; Format: CD	51	18	41
What About Me?	Released: March 2009; Label: One World Music; Format: CD, digital	—	—	—

=== Video albums ===
List of video albums, with selected details and certifications
Title	Details	Certifications
Unity Through Diversity / All Who Wander Are Not Lost	Released: 2002; Label: Format: DVD	
1 Giant Leap	Released: 2002; Label: Palm; Format: DVD	
What About Me?	Released: 2008; Label: Channel 4; Format: DVD	ARIA: Gold

=== Singles ===
List of singles, with selected chart positions
Title	Year	Peak chart positions								Album
Title	Year	UK	AUS	BEL (FL)	GER	ITA	NLD	NZ	SWI	Album
"My Culture" (featuring Maxi Jazz and Robbie Williams)	2002	9	30	50	69	16	42	26	51	1 Giant Leap
"Braided Hair" (featuring Neneh Cherry and Speech)	2002	78	—	—	—	—	96	—	—	1 Giant Leap
