= The Boy in the Dress (musical) =

2019 stage musical

- Music: Robbie Williams; Guy Chambers; Chris Heath
- Lyrics: Robbie Williams; Guy Chambers; Chris Heath
- Book: Mark Ravenhill
- Basis: The Boy in the Dress by David Walliams
- Premiere: 8 November 2019: Royal Shakespeare Theatre, Stratford-upon-Avon
- Productions: 2019 Stratford-upon-Avon

The Boy in the Dress is a musical with music and lyrics by Robbie Williams, Guy Chambers and Chris Heath and a book by Mark Ravenhill. The musical is based on the 2008 novel of the same name, written by David Walliams. The story is about a twelve-year-old boy, Dennis, who enjoys wearing a dress and the reactions of his family and friends.

== Background ==
The musical is based on the 2008 novel The Boy in the Dress, which was written by David Walliams, with illustration by Quentin Blake. The novel was previously adapted into a BBC television short film in 2014.

In February 2018, Gregory Doran, artistic director of the Royal Shakespeare Company, confirmed that the RSC was working with David Walliams on an undisclosed project. In May 2018, the show was officially confirmed and received its world premiere in 2019 in Stratford-upon-Avon for the festive period. The show has a book by playwright Mark Ravenhill and is directed by Gregory Doran. The musical features an original score by Robbie Williams and Guy Chambers.

== Production history ==
=== World premiere: Stratford-upon-Avon (2019) ===
The world premiere of the musical, presented by the Royal Shakespeare Company, began previews on 8 November 2019, with press night on 27 November 2019, and ran until 8 March 2020 at the Royal Shakespeare Theatre in Stratford-upon-Avon. The production was directed by Gregory Doran, designed by Robert Jones, choreographed by Aletta Collins and lighting designed by Mark Henderson.

On 22 August 2019 the initial adult casting was announced including Rufus Hound as Dad, Natasha Lewis as Darvesh's Mum, Forbes Masson as Mr Hawtrey and Irvine Iqbal as Raj. The complete casting was announced on 9 September 2019.

In an interview with WhatsOnStage.com, Doran revealed that the production was due to transfer to the Savoy Theatre in London's West End opening in autumn 2020, however due to the COVID-19 pandemic, plans were postponed.

As of 2024, there are no plans to re-stage the production.

== Cast and characters ==
Character	Stratford-upon-Avon
Character	2019
Dennis	Oliver Crouch; Jack Hobson; Jackson Laing; Tom Lomas; Toby Mocrei
Lisa James	Asha Banks; Tabitha Knowles; Miriam Nyarko
Dad	Rufus Hound
Mr Hawtrey	Forbes Masson
Raj	Irvine Iqbal
John	Alfie Jukes; Zachary Loonie
Darvesh	Ethan Dattani; Shivain Kara-Patel; Kassian Shae Ahktar; Arjun Singh Khakh
Darvesh's Mum	Natasha Lewis
Oddbod	Ben Thompson
Lorna	Charlotte Jaconelli
Louise	Grace Wylde
Mum / Miss Windsor	Charlotte Wakefield
Miss Bresslaw	Christina Modestou
Gareth	Alexander Moneypenny
Big Mac	Max Gill
Rory	Ryan Heenan
St Kenneth's Captain	Jamie Tyler
Maudlin Street Captain	David Birch
Ensemble	Hannah Fairclough; Ahmed Hamad; Alim Jayda; Clancy Ryan; Cilla Silvia
Swing	Jack Anthony Smart; Georgie Westall

== Musical numbers ==
Act I

- "Ordinary" – Company
- "If I Don't Cry" – Dennis
- "We Are The Winners" – Darvesh's Mum & Company
- "Three For The Price Of Two" – Raj
- "A House Without A Mum" – Dad, John & Dennis
- “School Uniform” - Miss Bresslaw & Company †
- "I Hate Kids" – Mr Hawtrey
- "Is There Anything More Beautiful Than Lisa James?" – Schoolkids
- "Disco Symphony" – Lisa, Dennis & Company
- "A Girl Who's Gonna Be" – Lorna, Louise, Dennis & Girl Gang
- "Miss Windsor's Belle Chanson" – Miss Windsor
- "A Boy In A Dress" – Company

Act II

- "Beach Holiday Sunday" – Company
- “A House Without A Mum” (reprise) - Dad†
- "When Things Fall Apart" – Lisa & Dennis
- "You Don't Have A Prayer" – Football Teams
- "You Can't Expel Us All" – Company
- "If I Don't Cry" (reprise) – Dad & Dennis
- "I Like To Put On A Dress" – Mr Hawtrey, Lisa, Dennis & Raj‡
- "Extraordinary" – Company
- Curtain Call: “You Can’t Expel Us All” and “Disco Symphony”

Keys

- † Not included on the Cast Recording.
- ‡ Originally titled "A Life of Discipline"

=== Original cast recording ===
A cast recording featuring the original Stratford-upon-Avon cast was released on 4 December 2020 on CD, iTunes, Spotify, Apple Music and YouTube Music. It features 21 tracks including 2 bonus demo tracks "If I Don't Cry" and "A House Without A Mum" by co-songwriter Robbie Williams.

To launch the album, the RSC live streamed an event called The Boy in the Dress: A Celebration on 5 December 2020 which featured author David Walliams reading from the original novel and co-songwriter Guy Chambers performing songs with Toby Mocrei and Miriam Nyarko (reprising the roles of Dennis and Lisa respectively).

Williams recorded a version of "Disco Symphony" which was released as part of the deluxe edition of the XXV compilation album in 2022 with additional lyrics by comedian Jimmy Carr.

== Critical reception ==
The musical's premiere in Stratford-upon-Avon received positive reviews from critics and audiences. It received five star reviews from The Independent, Financial Times, WhatsOnStage, Reviewshub and BroadwayWorld and four stars from The Guardian, The Observer, The Sun, Evening Standard and The Sunday Times.
