= Under the Radar Volume 2 =

Compilation album by Robbie Williams
- Released: 30 November 2017
- Recorded: 2004–2017
- Length: 55:44
- Label: Farrell Music
- Producer: Stuart Price; Piers Baron; Timothy Metcalfe; Flynn Francis; Johnny McDaid; Ellis Taylor; Phillip Steinke; Steve Robson; Karl Brazil; Ben Castle; Fil Eisler; Steve Power; Richard Scott

Robbie Williams chronology
| The Heavy Entertainment Show (2016) | Under the Radar Volume 2 (2017) | Under the Radar Volume 3 (2019) |

Singles from Under the Radar Volume 2
- 1. "Eyes on the Highway" Released: 9 August 2017; 2. "Go Mental" Released: 29 September 2017; 3. "Run It Wild" Released: 3 November 2017; 4. "Andy Warhol" Released: 22 February 2018; 5. "My Fuck You to You" Released: 16 April 2018

Under the Radar Volume 2 is a compilation album by English singer Robbie Williams, comprising demos, B-sides and rarities. It was released exclusively through Williams' website on 30 November 2017.

On 11 July 2017, Williams had announced that the follow-up to his 2014 album, Under the Radar Volume 2, would be released in November of that year and was available to pre-order from his official website.

== Track listing ==
Under the Radar Volume 2 track listing
| No. | Title | Writer(s) | Producer(s) | Length |
|---|---|---|---|---|
| 1. | "Satellites" | Robbie Williams; Stuart Price | Price | 4:06 |
| 2. | "9 to 5" | Dolly Parton | Piers Baron; Timothy Metcalfe | 3:40 |
| 3. | "Ms Pepper" | Williams; Metcalfe; Flynn Francis | Francis; Metcalfe | 4:02 |
| 4. | "Bambi" | Williams; Metcalfe; Piers Baron | Baron; Metcalfe | 3:21 |
| 5. | "Eyes on the Highway" | Williams; Metcalfe; Baron | Baron; Metcalfe | 4:22 |
| 6. | "Speaking Tongues" | Williams; Johnny McDaid; Ellis Taylor | McDaid; Taylor | 3:37 |
| 7. | "Go Mental" (featuring Big Narstie and Atlantic Horns) | Williams; Price; Tyrone Lindo; Felix Buxton; Mark Brown; Benjamin Edwards; Michael Kearsey | Price | 3:28 |
| 8. | "Run It Wild" | Williams; Metcalfe; Flynn Francis; Phillip Steinke | Francis; Metcalfe; Steinke | 3:42 |
| 9. | "Numb" | Williams; Steve Robson; Ed Drewett | Robson | 4:02 |
| 10. | "Andy Warhol" | Williams; Karl Brazil; Ben Castle | Brazil; Castle | 3:59 |
| 11. | "My Fuck You to You" | Williams; Fil Eisler | Fil Eisler | 3:42 |
| 12. | "Weakness" | Williams; Gary Barlow | Steve Power | 4:15 |
| 13. | "Booty Call" | Williams; Richard Scott; Kelvin Andrews; Scott Ralph; Danny Spencer | Scott | 2:56 |
| 14. | "On the Fence" | Williams; Scott; Andrews; Ralph | Scott | 3:06 |
| 15. | "International Entertainment" | Williams; Metcalfe; Baron | Baron; Metcalfe | 3:21 |
| Total length: | | | | 55:44 |
