= Time for Change =

Time for Change may refer to:

- Time for Change, a 2005 album by Apache Indian
- Time for Change (album), a 1995 album by Wendy Moten
- Time for Change (song), a 2019 song by Robbie Williams
- Time for Change, a 1999 EP by Capdown
- Time-for-change model, a formula for predicting the results of American presidential elections devised by Alan Abramowitz

== See also ==
- Time for a Change (disambiguation)
