= List of UK Albums Chart number ones of the 2010s =

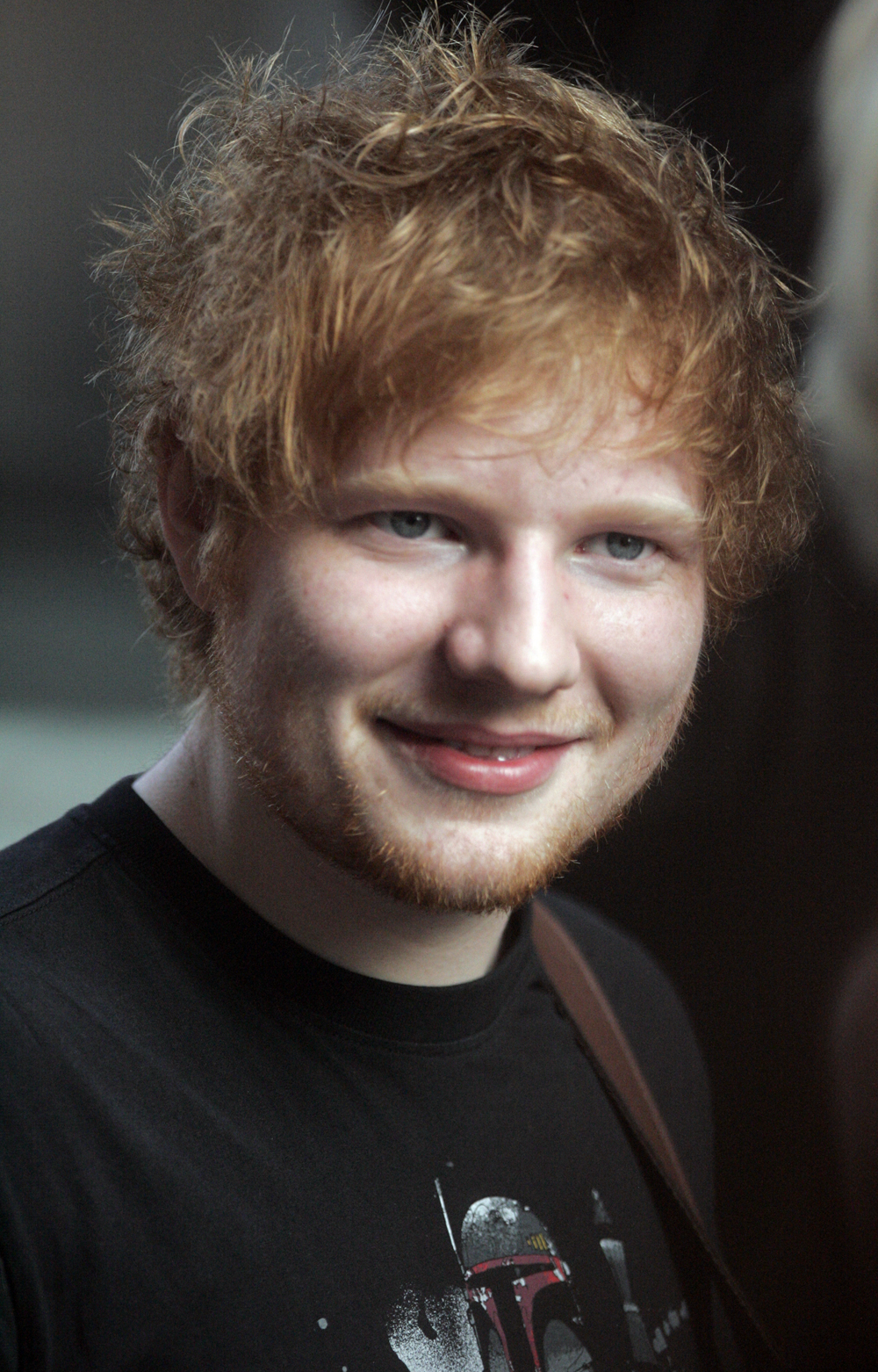
Releasing four albums in the decade, Ed Sheeran spent a total of 41 weeks at number one, more than any other artist.

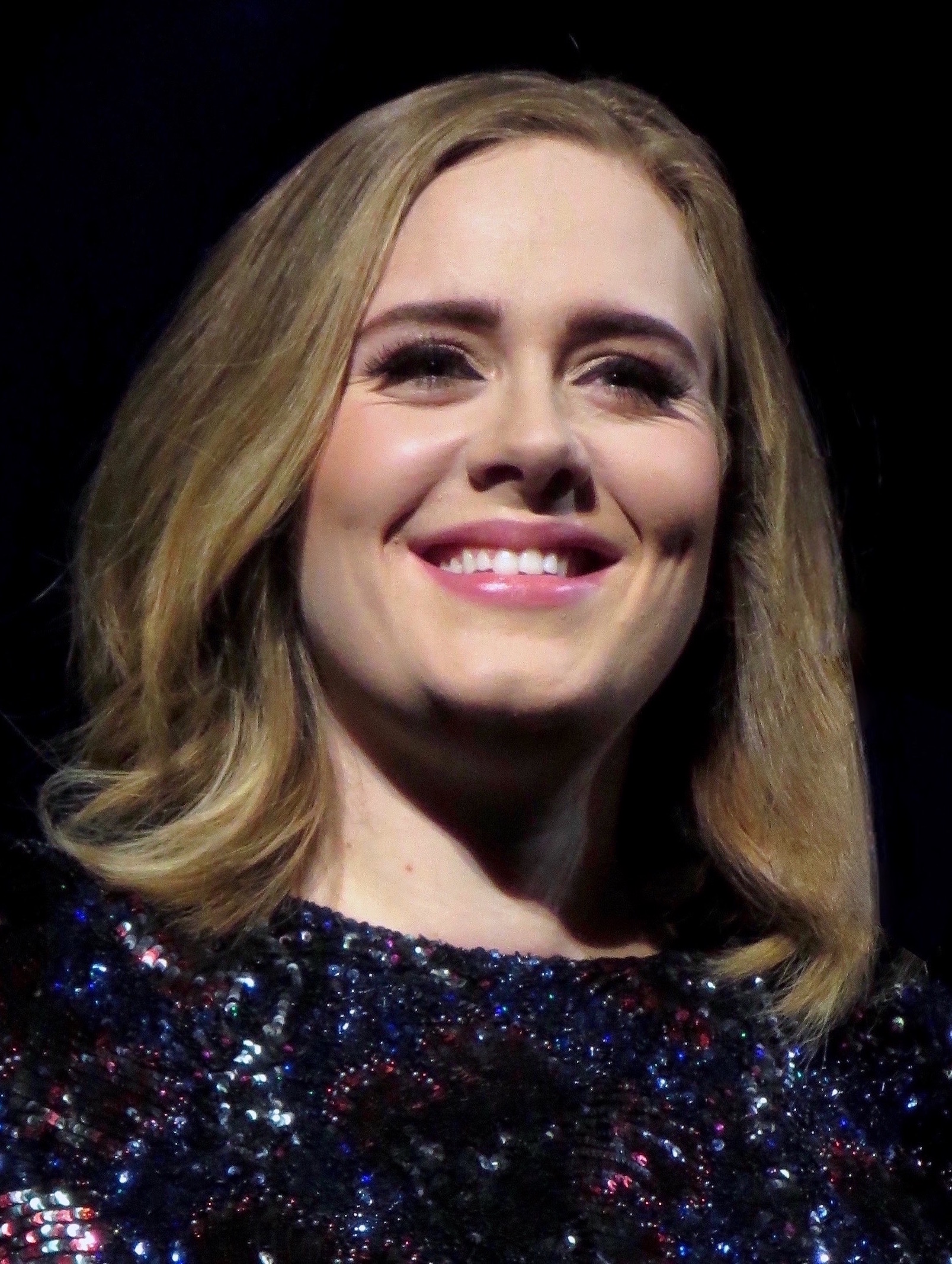
Adele's 2015 album 25 sold 800,307 copies in its first week, becoming the fastest-selling album of all time in the UK. Her two albums released in the 2010s, 21 and 25, were the two best-selling albums of the decade.

The UK Albums Chart is a weekly record chart based on album sales from Friday to Thursday in the United Kingdom; as of 15 February 2019, there had been 266 number-one albums during the 2010s, by 76 artists. The Official Charts Company (OCC) defines an "album" as being a type of music release that feature more than four tracks and last longer than 25 minutes; sales of albums in the UK are recorded on behalf of the British music industry by the OCC and compiled weekly as the UK Albums Chart.

The chart is based on both physical and digital album sales, as well as audio streaming, and each week's new number one is first announced every Friday (previously Sunday) on The Official Chart on BBC Radio 1, which is currently hosted by Scott Mills. The album chart is published online by Radio 1 (Top 40), in Music Week magazine (Top 75), on the OCC website (Top 100) and the full Top 200 is published exclusively in UKChartsPlus. In June 2010, Time Flies... 1994–2009 by Oasis became the 900th album ever to top the UK Albums Chart, in November 2013, Swings Both Ways by Robbie Williams became the 1,000th, and in November 2016, 24 Hrs by Olly Murs became the 1,100th. Ed Sheeran, who released four albums during the decade, spent a total of 41 weeks at number one, more than any other artist, while the two albums released by Adele during the decade (21 and 25) spent 36 weeks at number one, and were the top two best-selling albums of the 2010s.

The following albums were all number one in the United Kingdom during the 2010s.

== Number-one albums ==
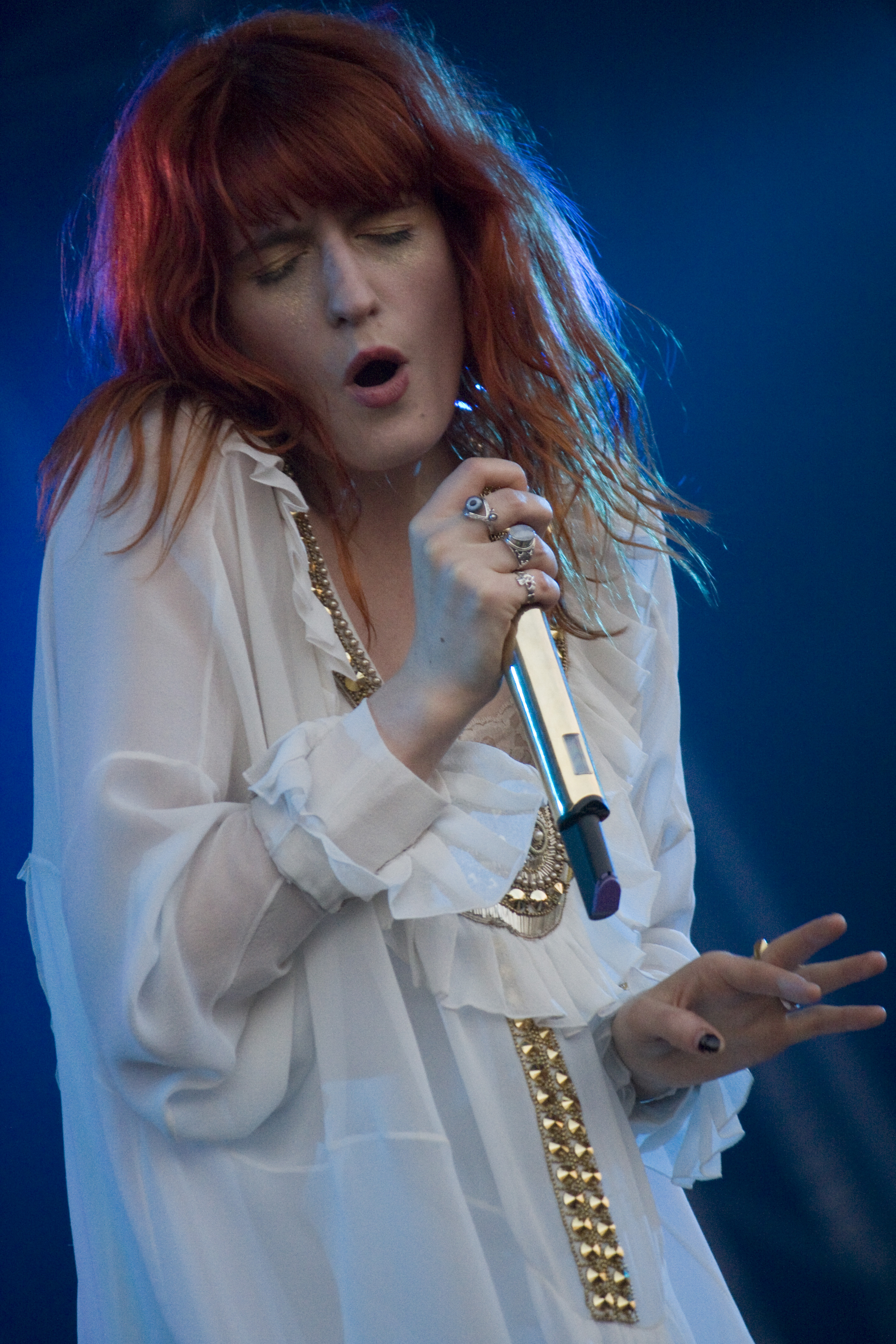
Florence and the Machine had the first new number-one album of the decade with their debut album Lungs—topping the chart again in November 2011 with Ceremonials and then for a third time in June 2015 with How Big, How Blue, How Beautiful.

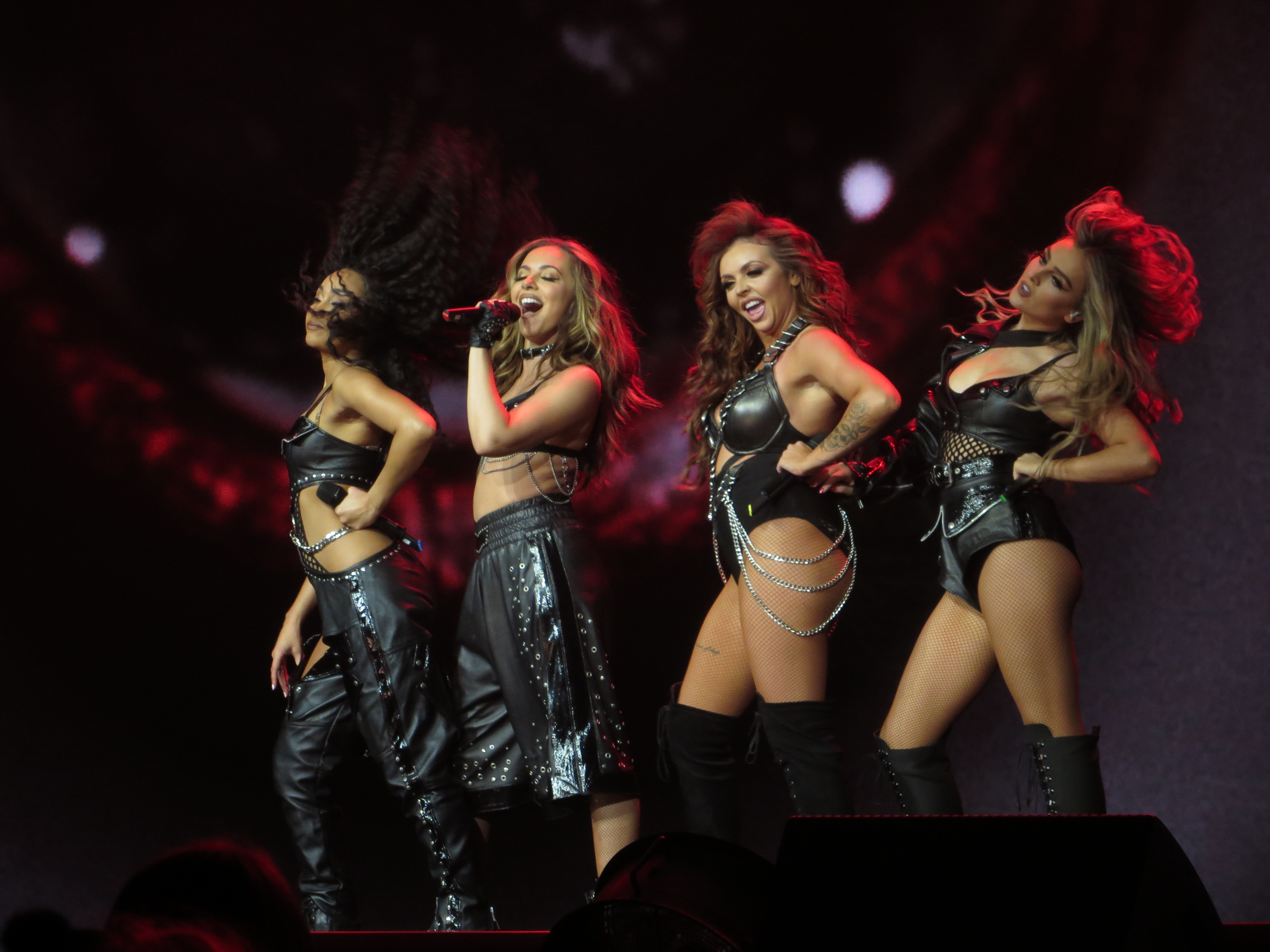
Little Mix achieved their number-one with Glory Days, in 2016. It had the highest first-week UK album sales for a girl group since Spiceworld in 1997, and became the fastest-selling number-one album by a girl group since 2001, with Survivor by Destiny's Child. It spent the most weeks at number one for a girl group album (5 weeks), since the Spice Girls spent 15 weeks at number one with Spice in 1996. In November 2018, it set a new chart record for the most weeks spent inside the top 40 of the UK Albums chart for a girl group album..

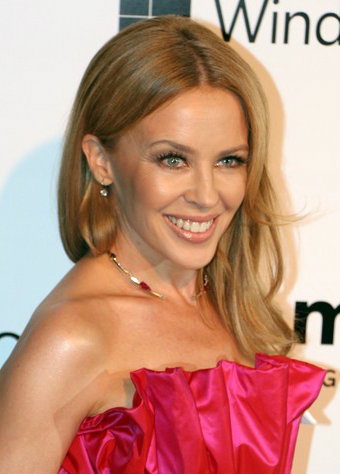
Kylie Minogue achieved her fifth number one in July 2010 with Aphrodite, making her the first act to achieve a number-one album in the 1980s, 1990s, 2000s and 2010s. She subsequently achieved her sixth number one in April 2018 with Golden and seventh number one in June 2019 with Step Back in Time: The Definitive Collection.

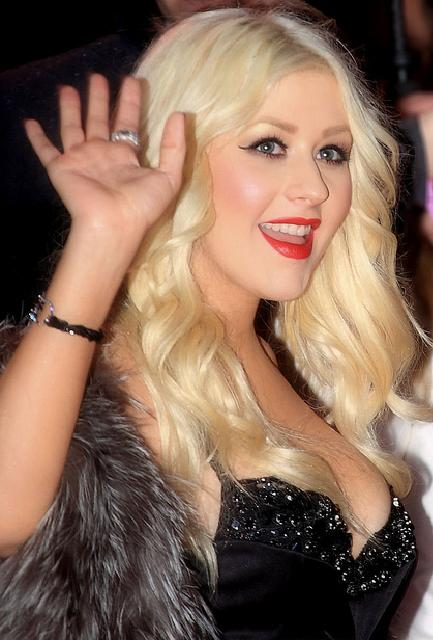
Christina Aguilera's sixth album, Bionic, made UK chart history in June 2010 by registering the largest drop in chart positions for a number-one album at the time, when it fell 28 places to number 29. Selling 24,000 copies, it became the lowest selling number-one album in eight years.

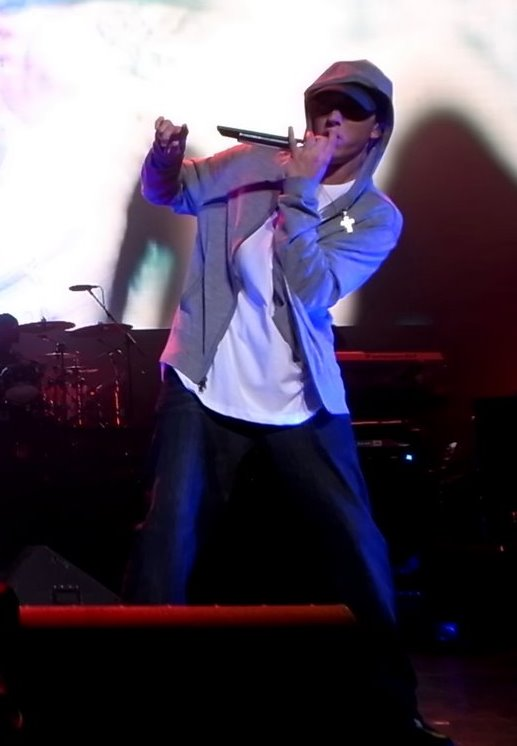
In September 2018, Eminem broke the UK chart record for the most consecutive number-one albums, with nine, after his album "Kamikaze" topped the chart. He had previously scored number ones earlier in the decade with "Recovery", "The Marshall Mathers LP 2", and "Revival".

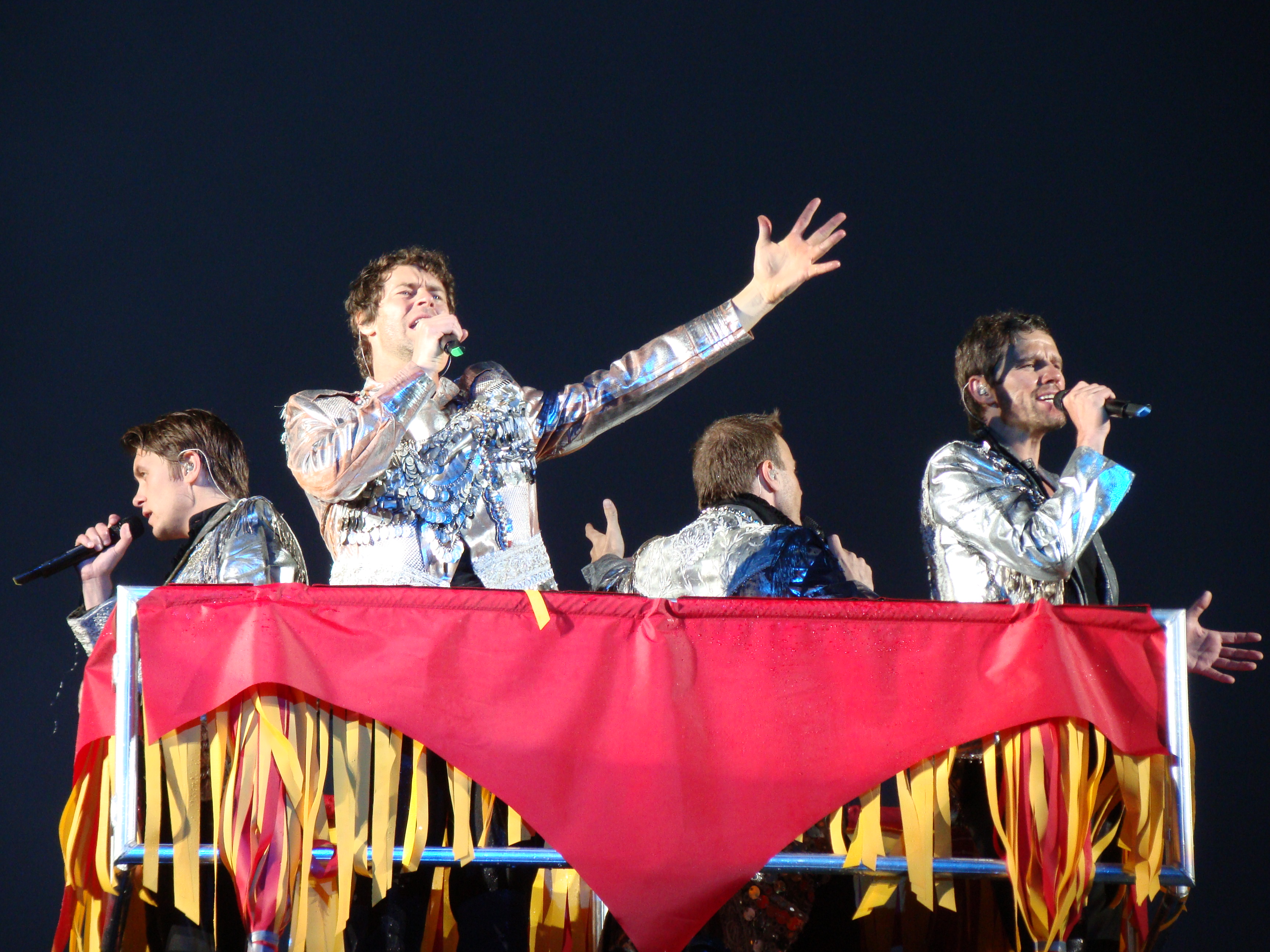
Take That's sixth album Progress sold 520,000 copies in one week to become the second-fastest-selling album of all-time.

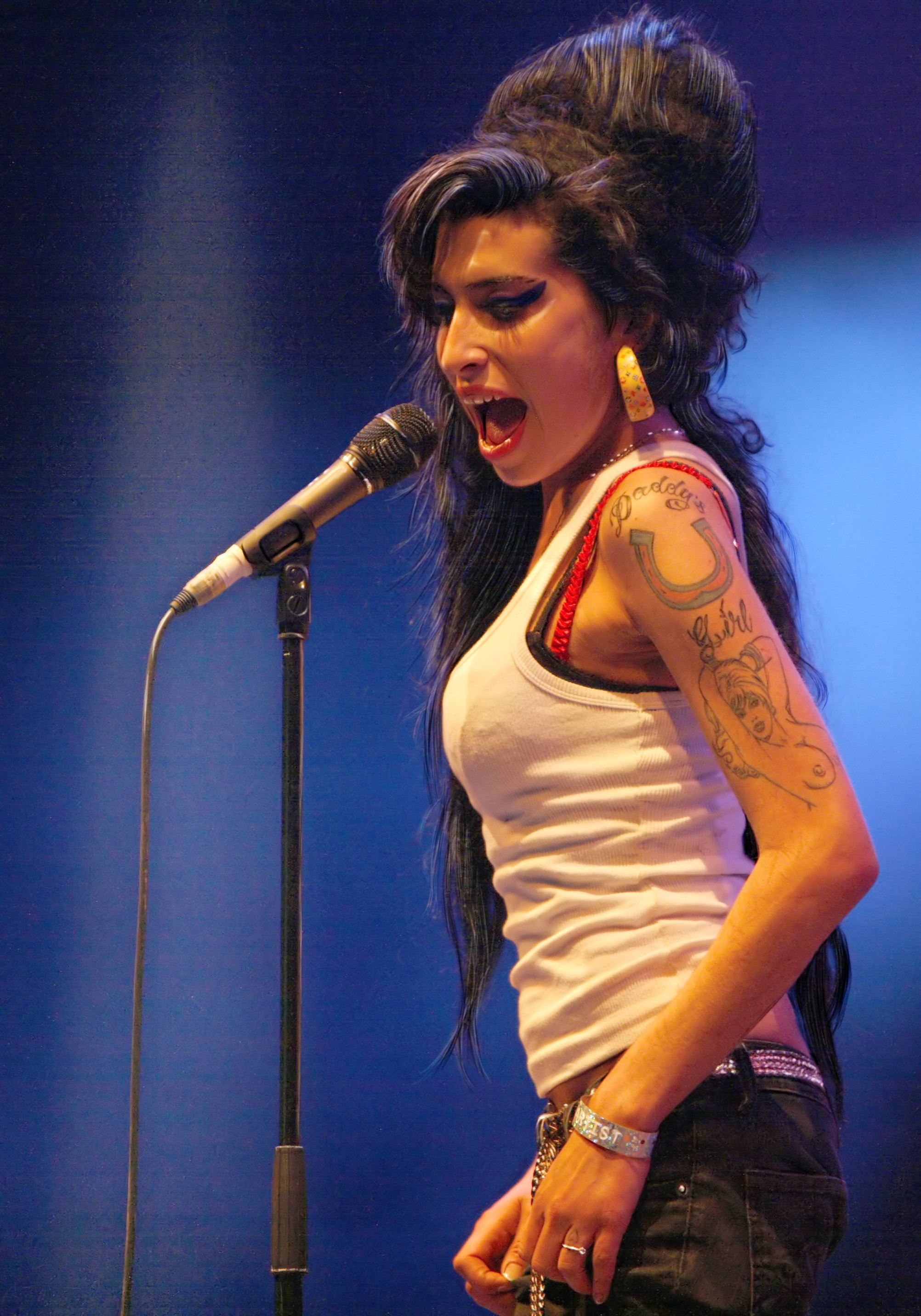
Following her death in July 2011, Amy Winehouse returned to number-one with Back to Black (2007) and again with the posthumous compilation Lioness: Hidden Treasures in December.

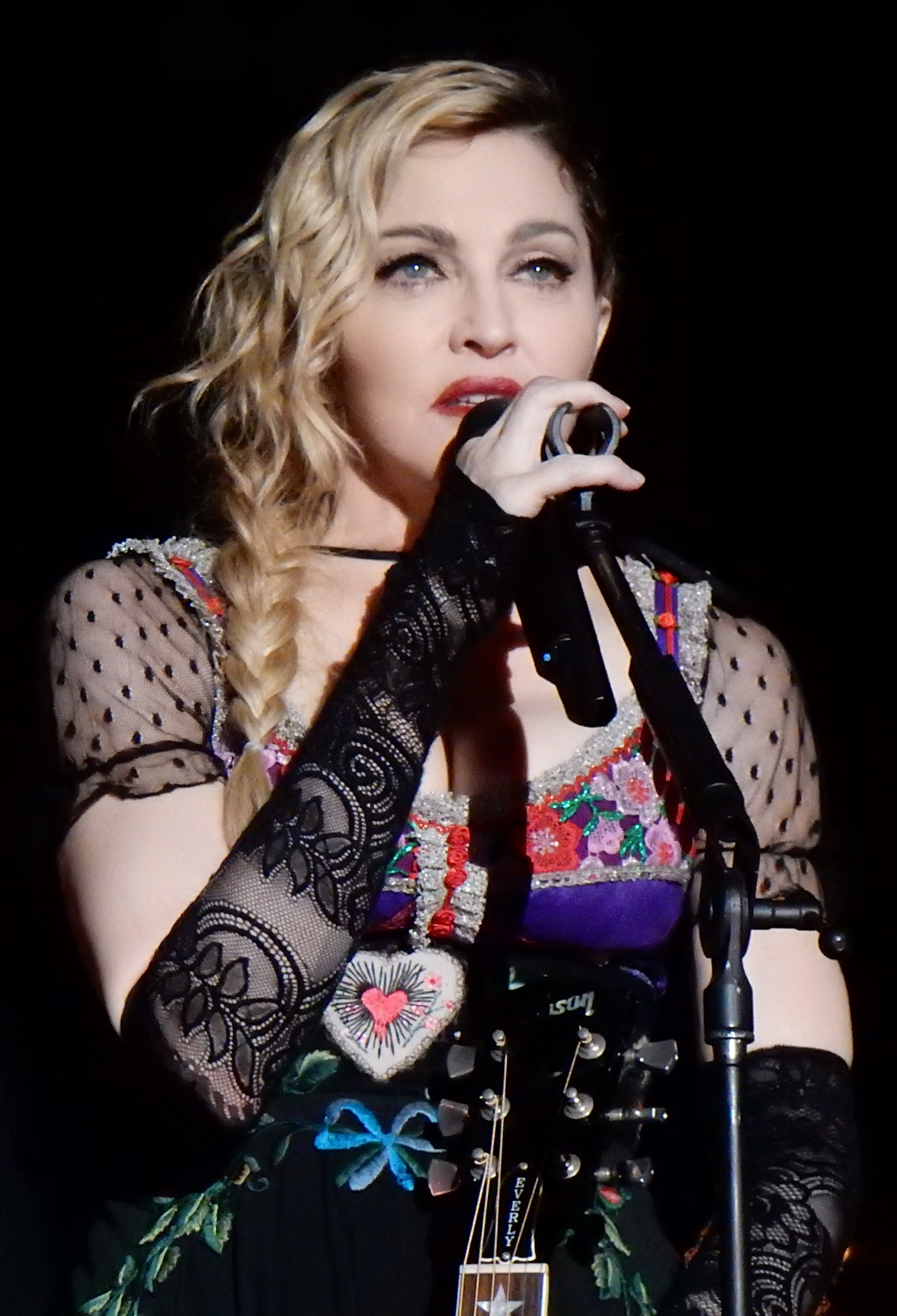
MDNA marked Madonna's twelfth number-one album in the UK.

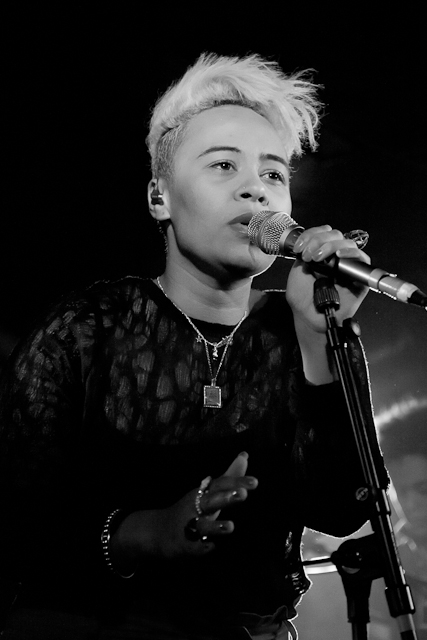
Emeli Sandé reached number-one in February 2012 with her debut album, Our Version of Events—which spent a total of ten non-consecutive weeks at the summit; including one as the Christmas number-one.

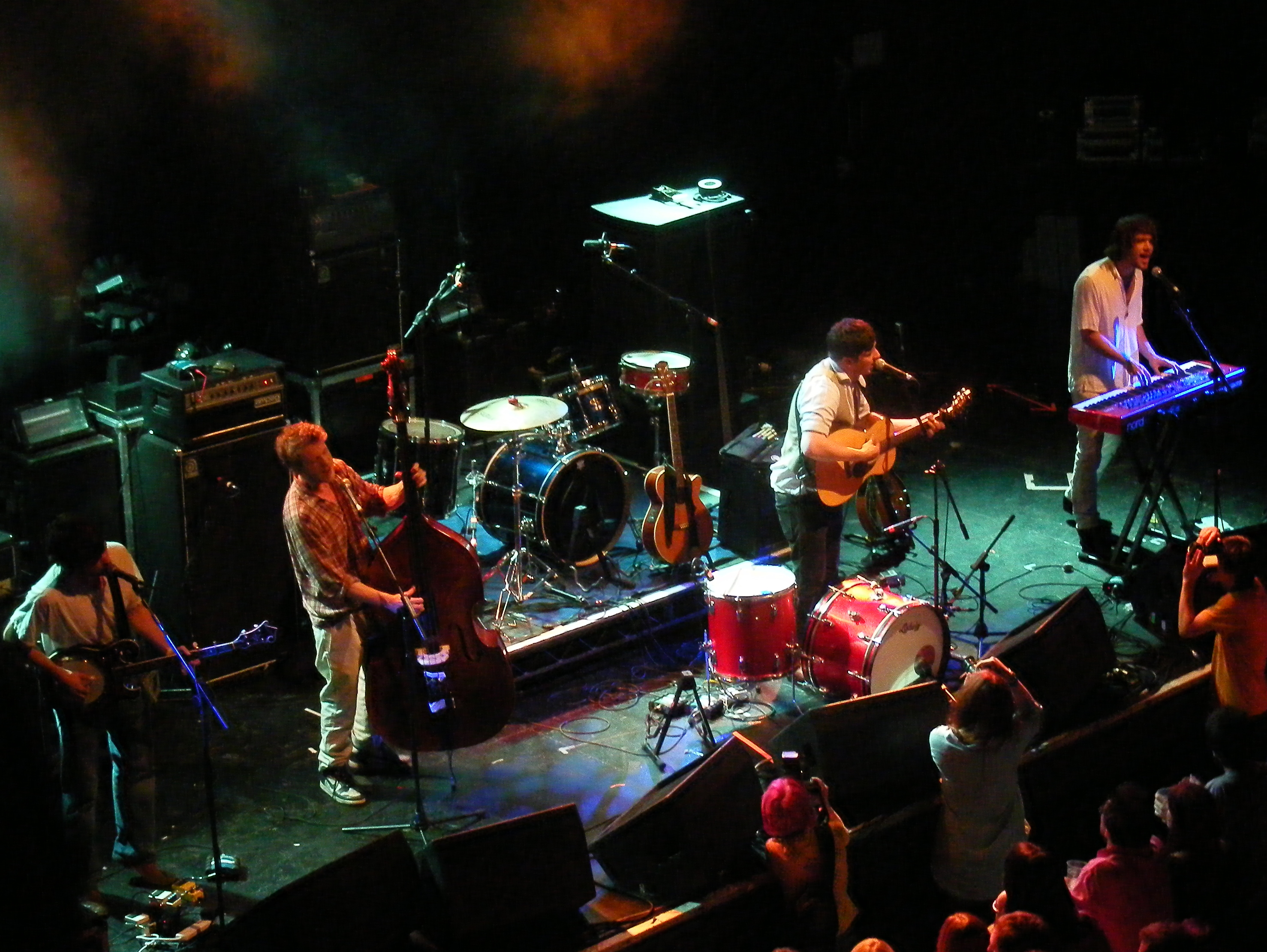
Mumford & Sons sold 158,923 copies of their second studio album Babel in one week in September 2012—the biggest first week sales of the year.

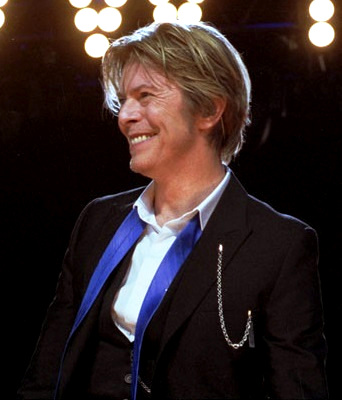
David Bowie reached number-one in March 2013 with The Next Day, his 24th studio album and first release since 2003 (Reality); and then again in January 2016 with his final studio album Blackstar, which was released just two days before his death. After spending three weeks at the top, Blackstar was replaced by Bowie's 2002 greatest hits collection, Best of Bowie.

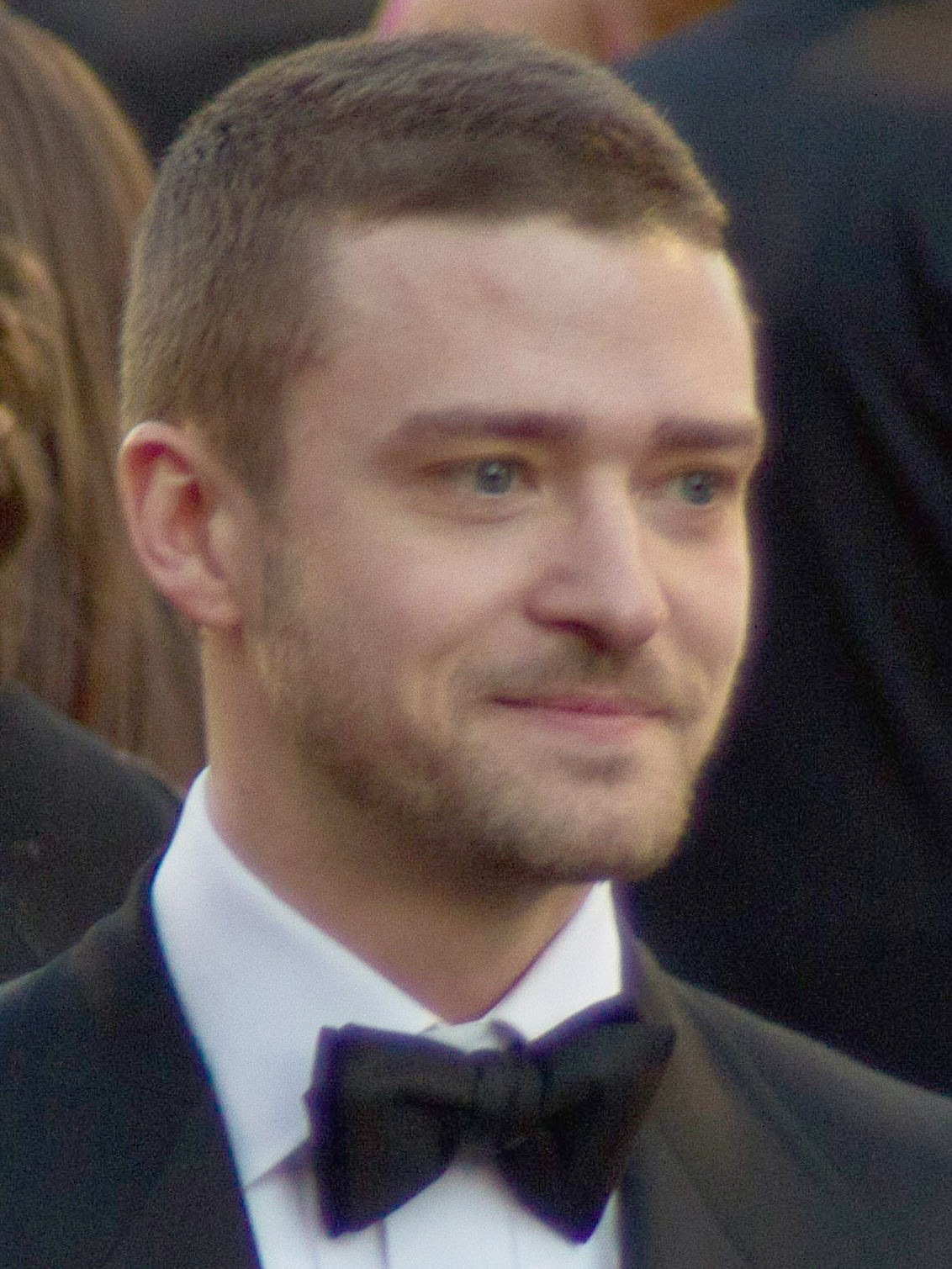
Justin Timberlake attained the highest first week sales of the year in March 2013 (105,888 copies), when his third studio album—The 20/20 Experience—reached the summit.

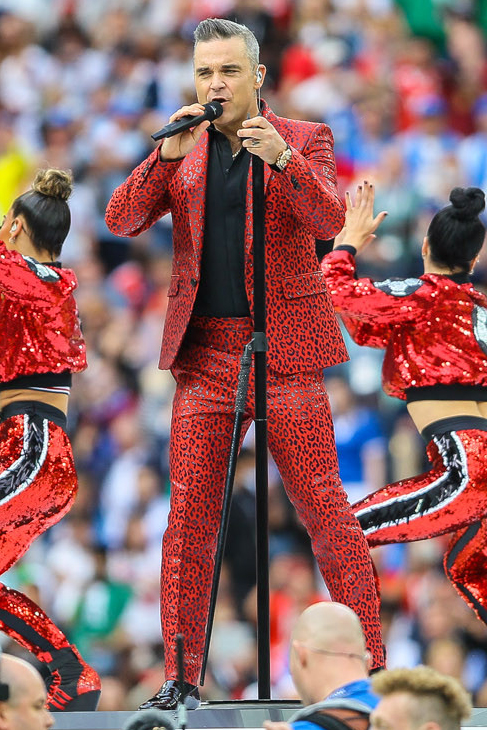
In November 2013, Robbie Williams' tenth album Swings Both Ways became the 1,000th album ever to top the album chart.

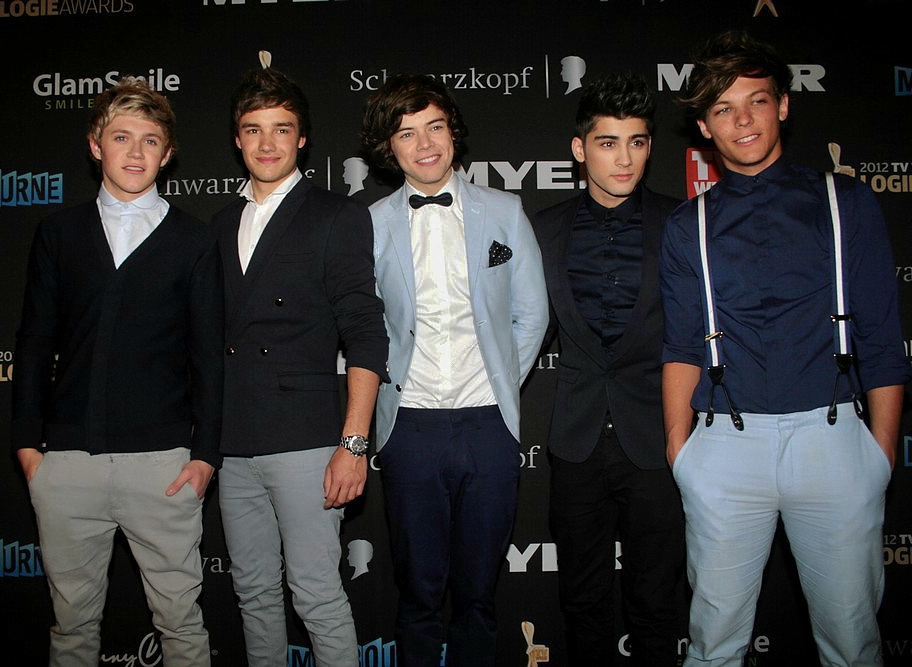
One Direction's third album Midnight Memories became the best selling album of 2013.

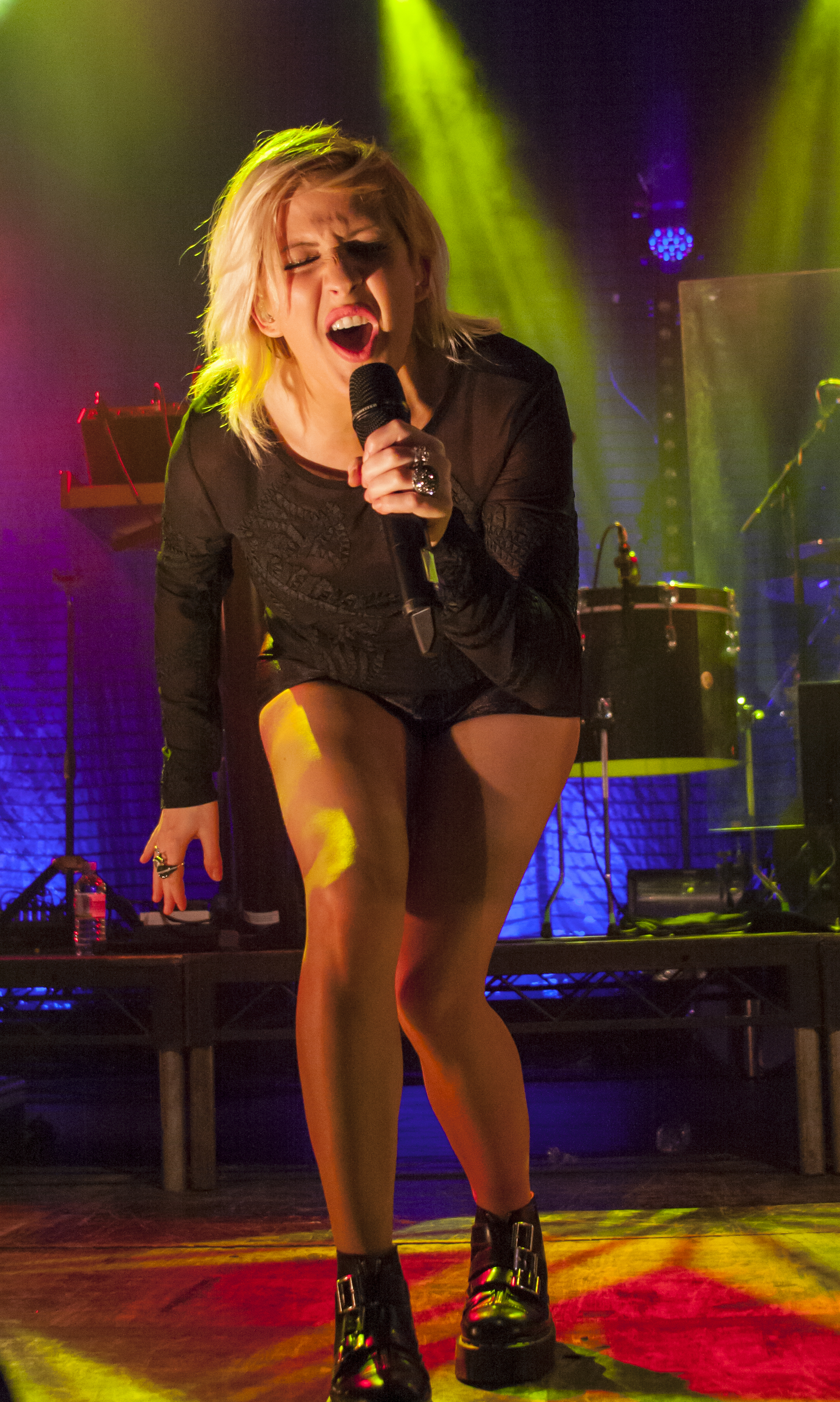
Ellie Goulding reached number-one in January 2014 with Halcyon after its 56th week in the chart.

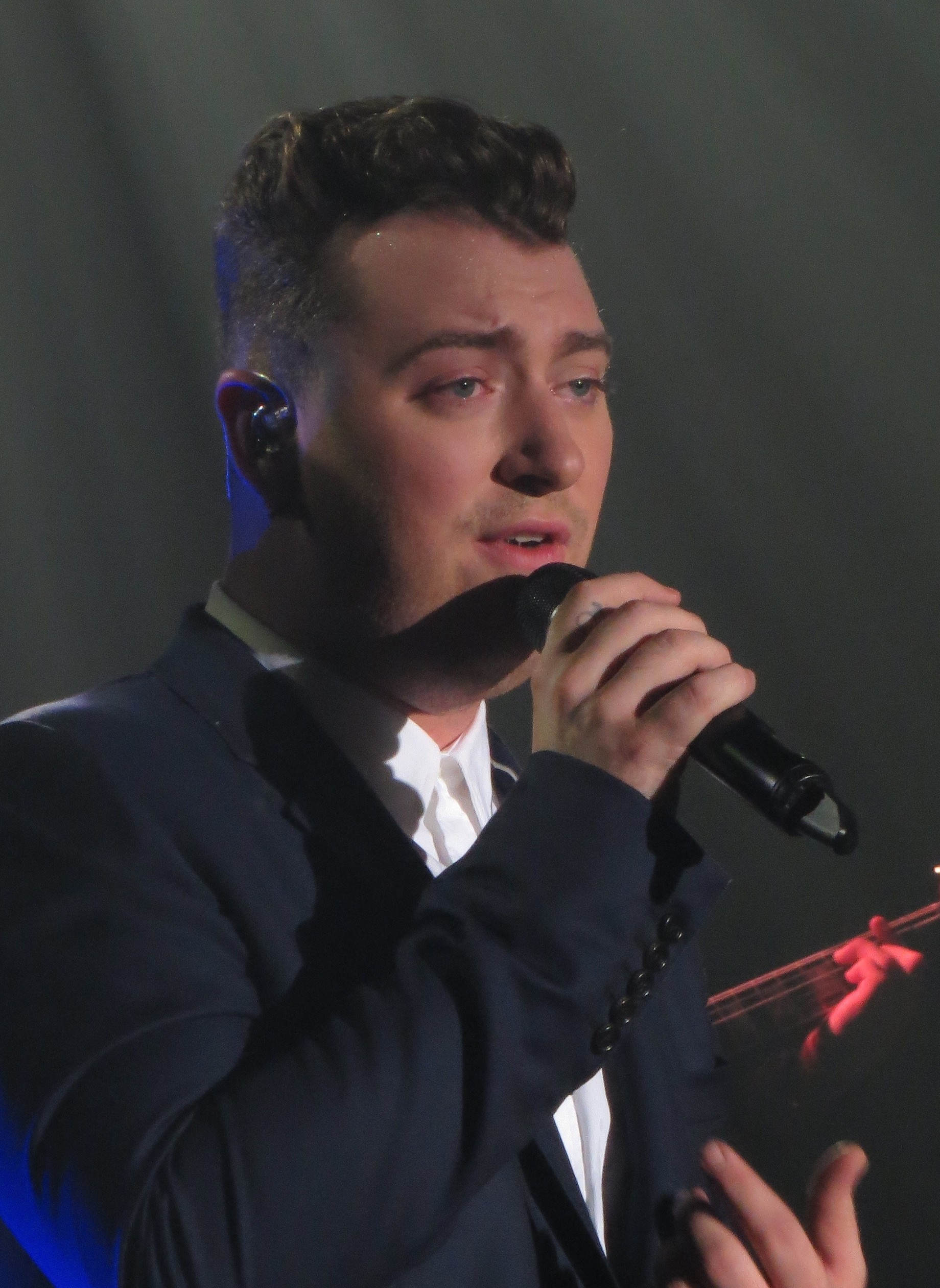
Sam Smith broke a record in March 2015 for the studio album by a male solo artist with the most non-consecutive runs at number one ever with In the Lonely Hour.

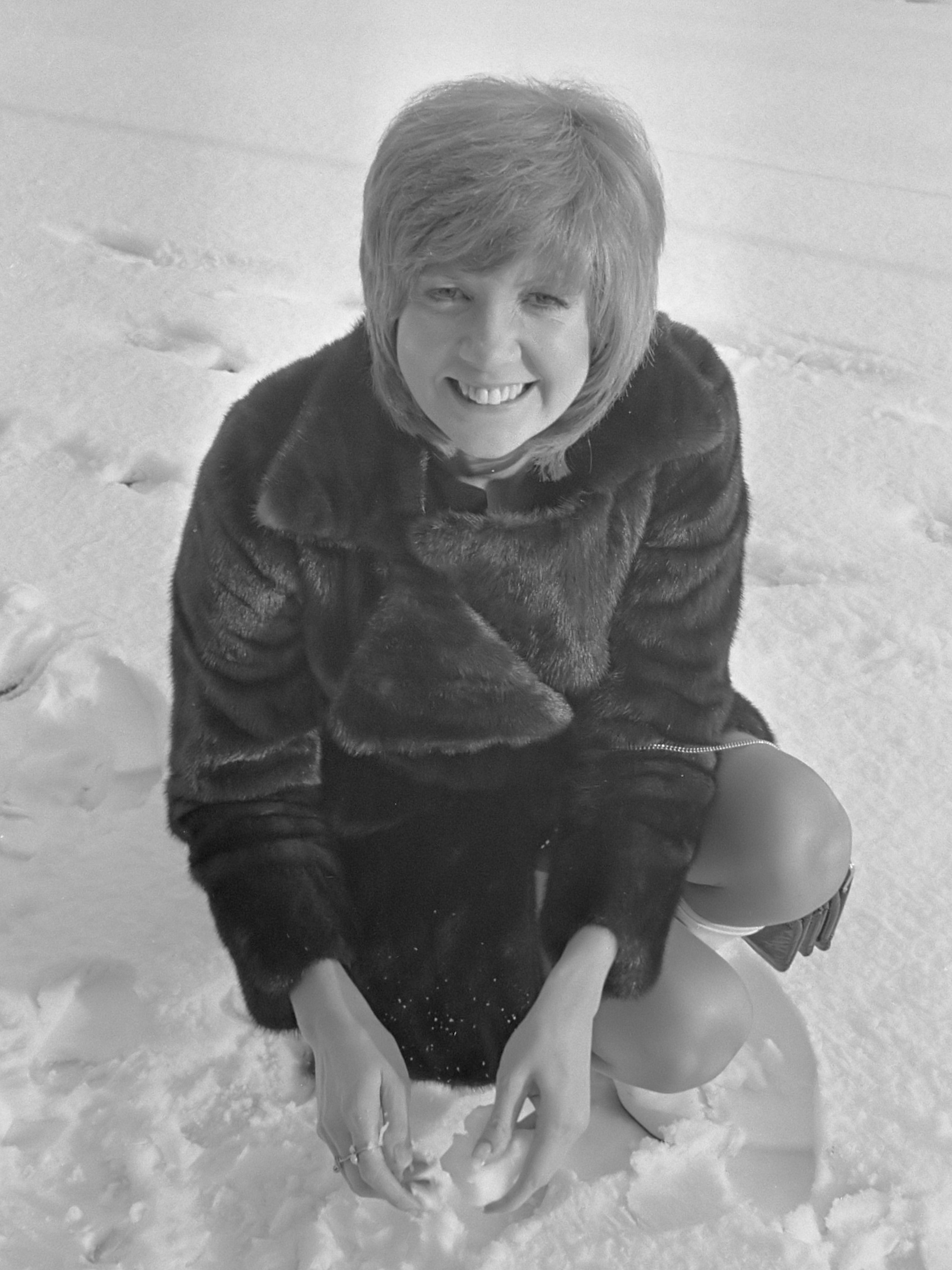
Following her death in August 2015, Cilla Black reached number-one with The Very Best of Cilla Black.

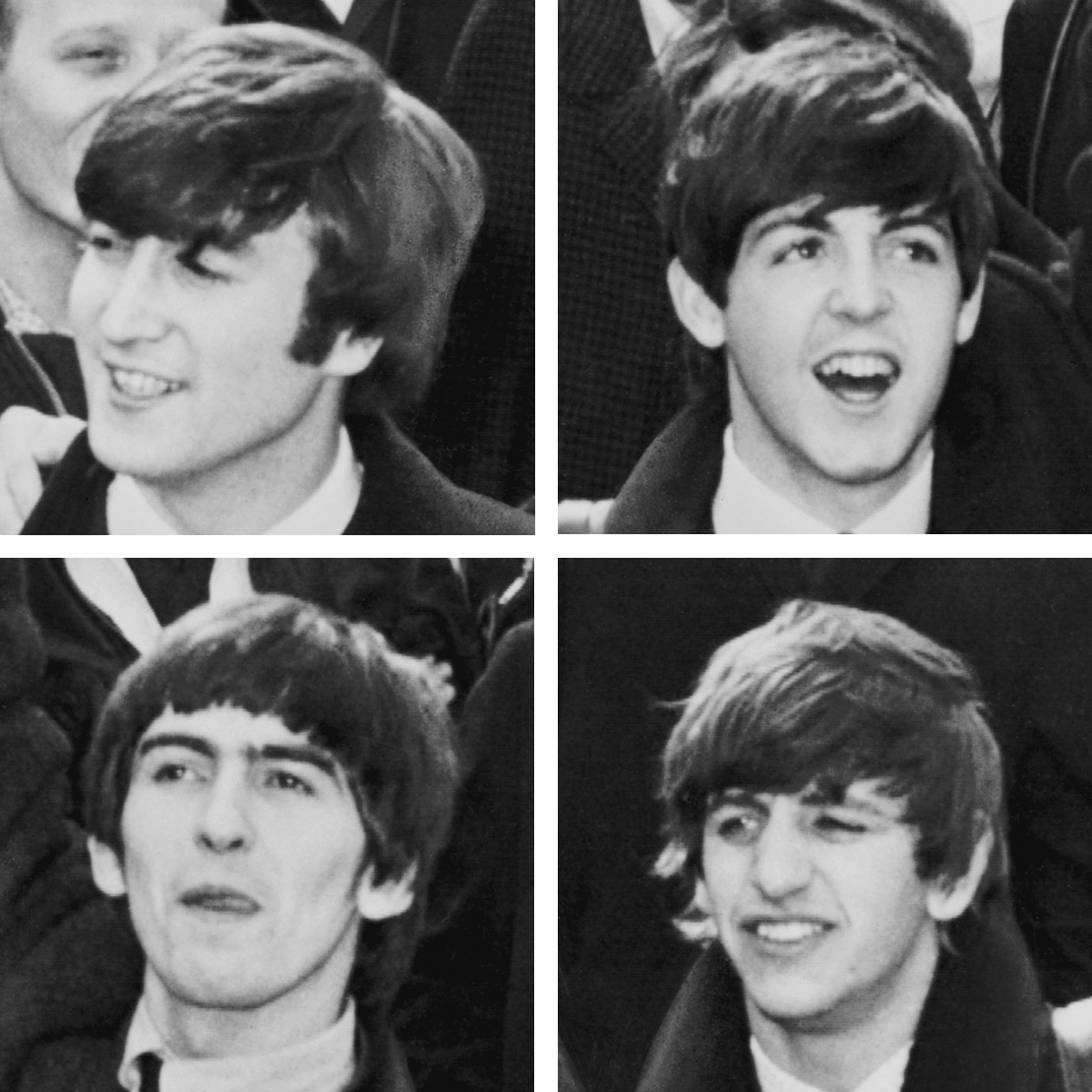
Sgt. Pepper's Lonely Hearts Club Band by the Beatles saw a return to number-one after 50 years when the album was reissued in 2017, meaning that the Beatles have achieved a number-one album in five different decades.

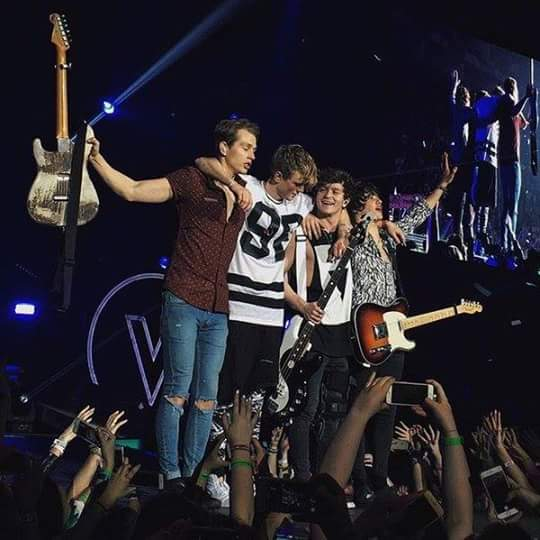
In August 2017, the Vamps gained their first number one with Night & Day, but the following week it dropped from number 1 to number 35, surpassing Christina Aguilera's record for the largest fall from the top spot.

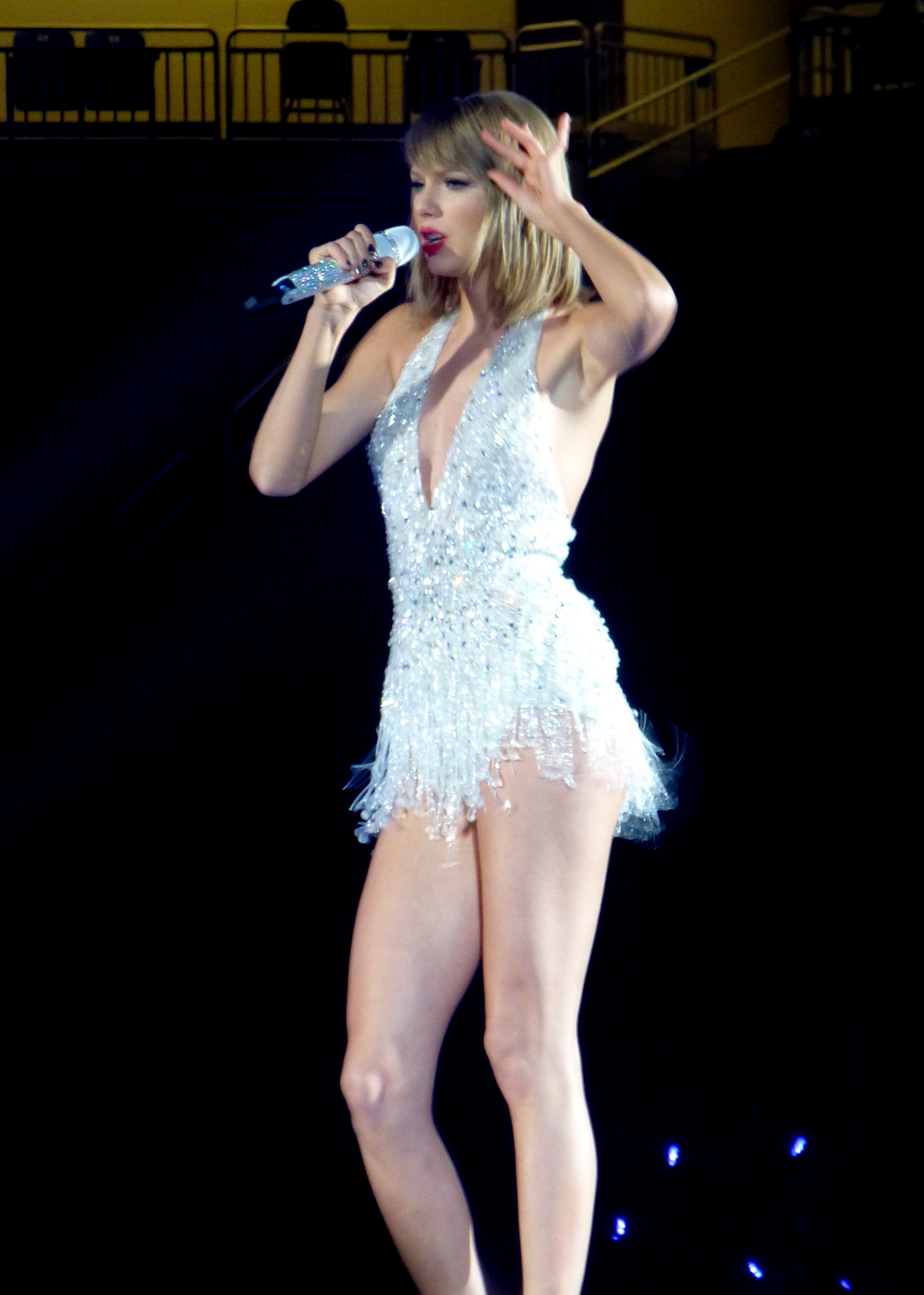
Taylor Swift has earned four number-one albums in this decade with her albums Red (2012), 1989 (2014), Reputation (2017) and Lover (2019).

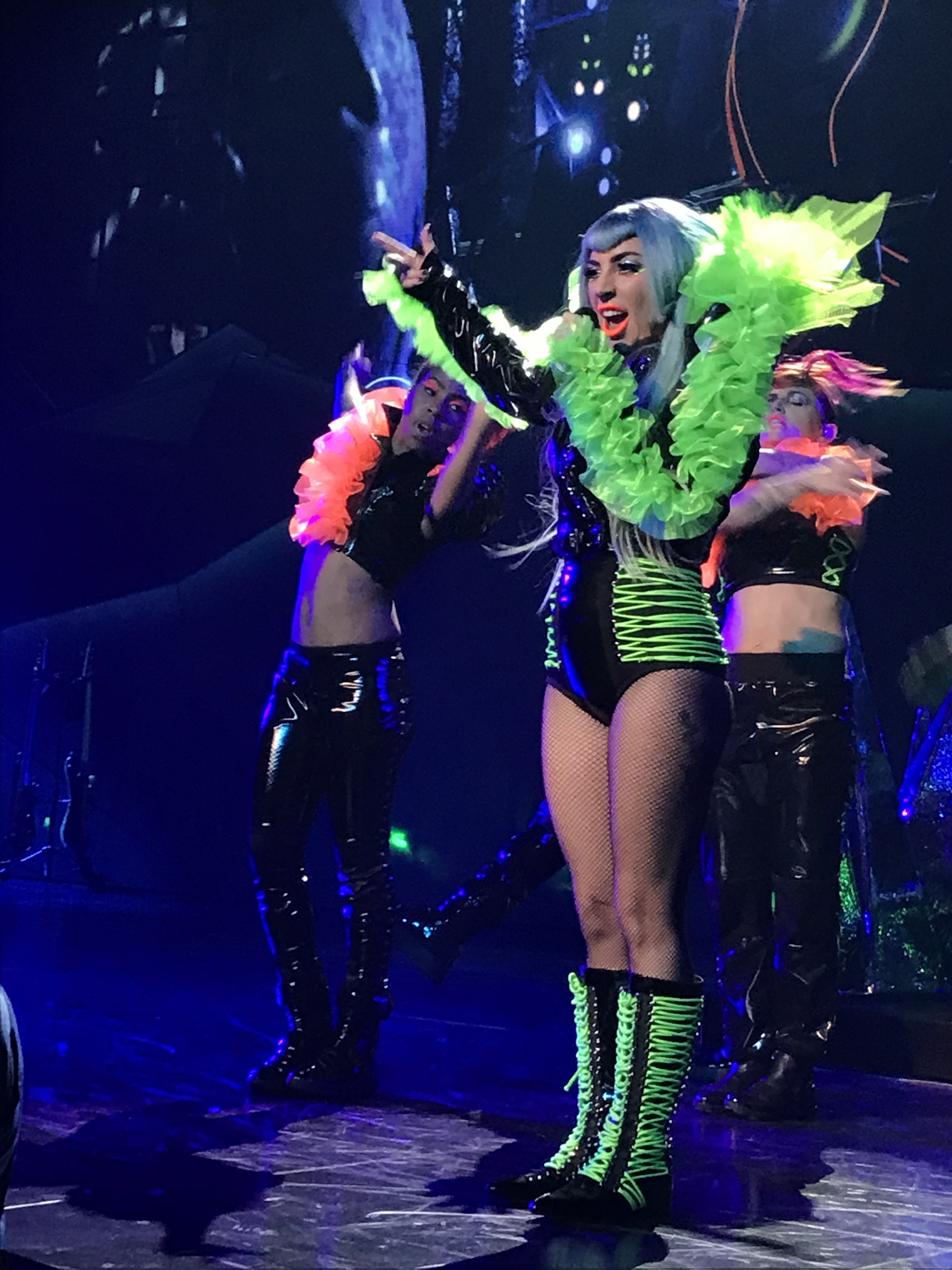
Lady Gaga has had four number-one albums this decade: The Fame (2010), Born This Way (2011), Artpop (2013) and A Star Is Born (2018).

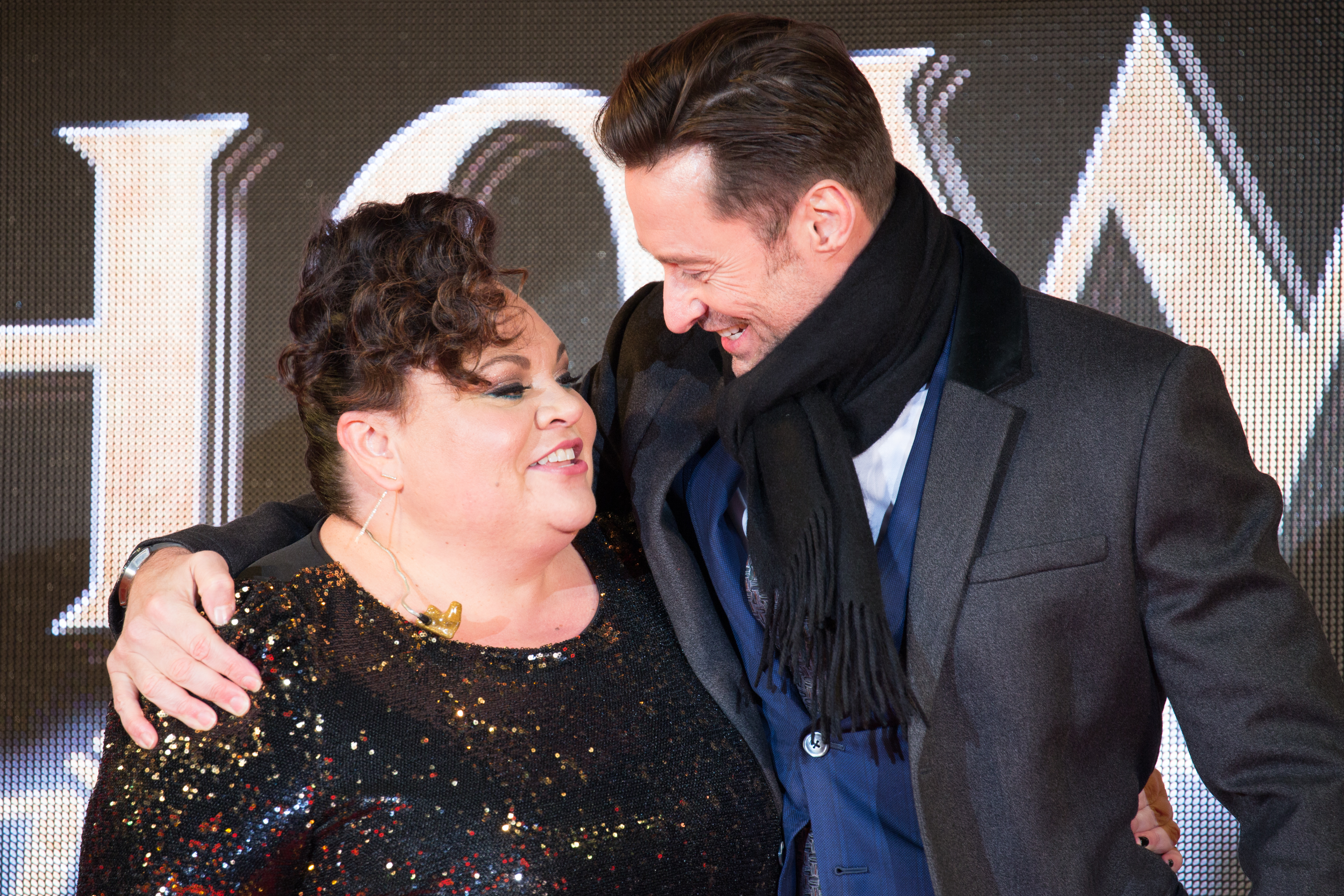
The soundtrack to the 2017 film The Greatest Showman broke records when it spent 28 non-consecutive weeks at number one during 2018 and 2019, the most weeks spent at number one for an album that decade.

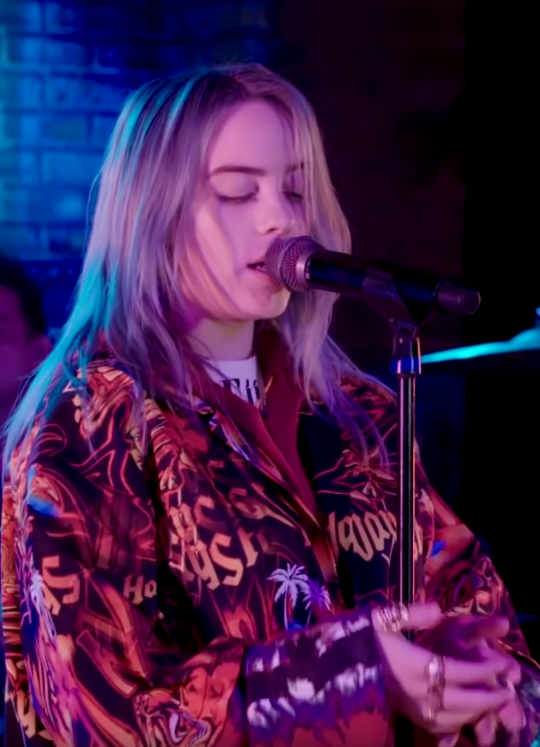
Billie Eilish was 17 years and four months old when she became the youngest female solo artist to top the album charts in 2019 with her debut album When We All Fall Asleep, Where Do We Go?

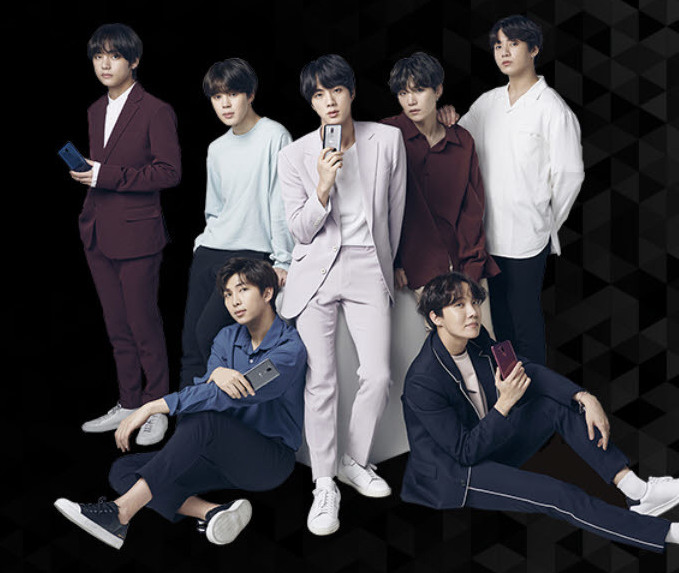
BTS became the first Korean act to top the album charts with their 2019 EP Map of the Soul: Persona.

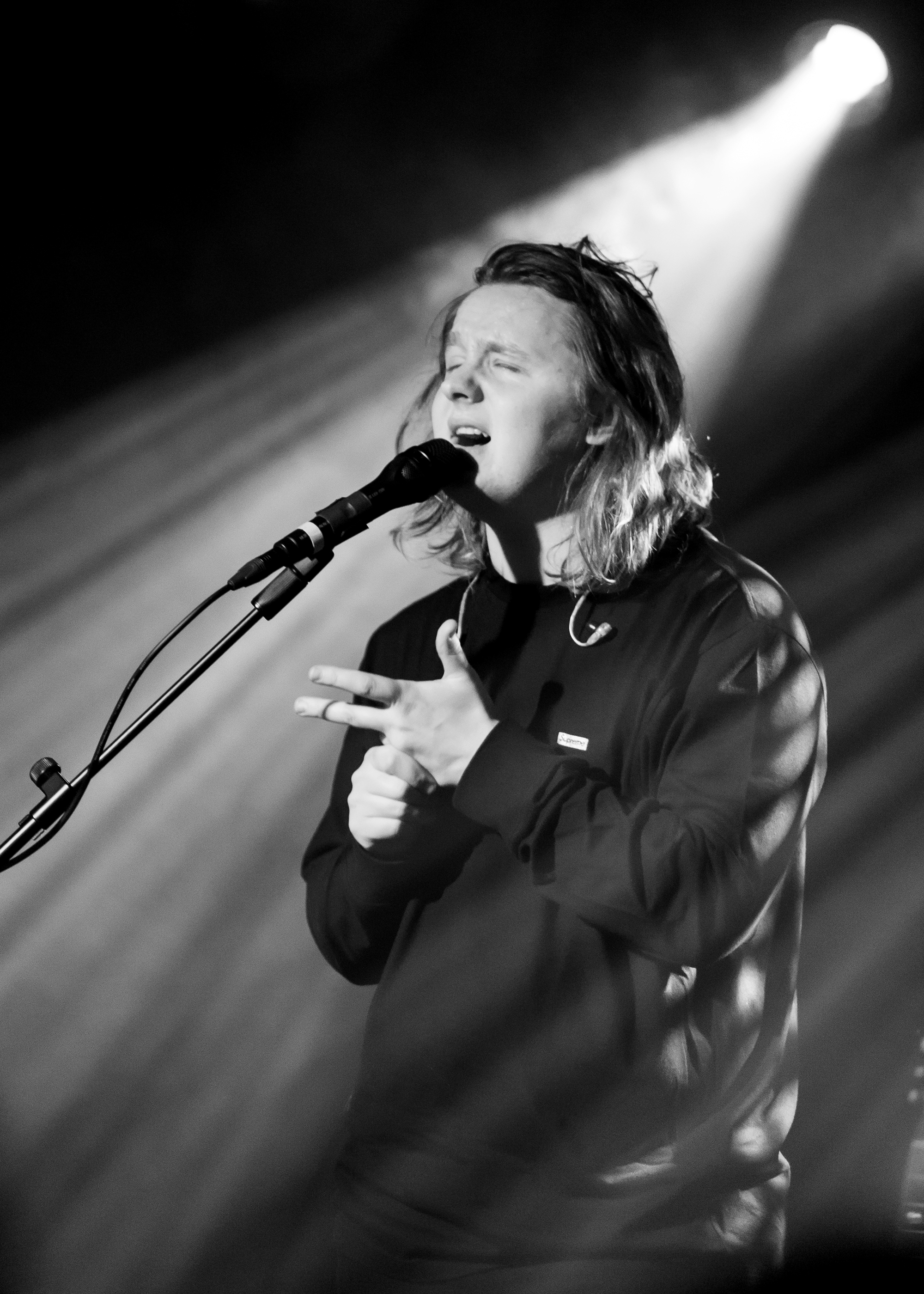
Lewis Capaldi's debut album Divinely Uninspired to a Hellish Extent became the best selling album of 2019.

Key
No.	nth album to top the UK Albums Chart
re	Return of an album to number one
†	Best-selling album of the year
‡	Best-selling album of the decade

No.	Artist (Note: The artist, album, date of reaching number one and number of weeks at number one are those given by the Official Charts Company.)	Album	Record label (Note: The record labels are those given by the Official Charts Company.)	Reached number one	Weeks at number one	Certification (Note: The certifications are those given by the British Phonographic Industry.)
2010
re	Paolo Nutini	Sunny Side Up	Atlantic	3 January 2010	2	6× Platinum
888	Florence and the Machine	Lungs	Island	17 January 2010	2	6× Platinum
re	Paolo Nutini	Sunny Side Up	Atlantic	31 January 2010	1	6× Platinum
889	Alicia Keys	The Element of Freedom	J	7 February 2010	2	3× Platinum
890	Glee Cast	Glee: The Music, Volume 1	Epic	21 February 2010	1	Platinum
re	Lady Gaga	The Fame	Interscope	28 February 2010	1	12× Platinum
891	Ellie Goulding	Lights	Polydor	7 March 2010	1	2× Platinum
892	Boyzone	Brother	Polydor	14 March 2010	1	Platinum
re	Lady Gaga	The Fame	Interscope	21 March 2010	1	12× Platinum
re	Boyzone	Brother	Polydor	28 March 2010	2	Platinum
re	Lady Gaga	The Fame	Interscope	11 April 2010	1	12× Platinum
893	Plan B	The Defamation of Strickland Banks	679/Atlantic	18 April 2010	1	4× Platinum
894	AC/DC	Iron Man 2	Columbia	25 April 2010	1	2× Platinum
re	Plan B	The Defamation of Strickland Banks	679/Atlantic	2 May 2010	1	4× Platinum
895	Diana Vickers	Songs from the Tainted Cherry Tree	RCA	9 May 2010	1	Gold
896	Keane	Night Train	Island	16 May 2010	1	Silver
re	The Rolling Stones	Exile on Main St.	Polydor	23 May 2010	1	Platinum
897	Pendulum	Immersion	Warner Bros.	30 May 2010	1	Platinum
898	Jack Johnson	To the Sea	Brushfire/Island	6 June 2010	1	Gold
899	Christina Aguilera	Bionic	RCA	13 June 2010	1	Silver
900	Oasis	Time Flies... 1994–2009	Big Brother	20 June 2010	1	8× Platinum
901	Eminem	Recovery	Interscope	27 June 2010	2	4× Platinum
902	Kylie Minogue	Aphrodite	Parlophone	11 July 2010	1	Platinum
re	Eminem	Recovery	Interscope	18 July 2010	3	4× Platinum
903	Arcade Fire	The Suburbs	Mercury	8 August 2010	1	Platinum
re	Eminem	Recovery	Interscope	15 August 2010	1	4× Platinum
904	Iron Maiden	The Final Frontier	EMI	22 August 2010	1	Gold
re	Eminem	Recovery	Interscope	29 August 2010	1	4× Platinum
905	Katy Perry	Teenage Dream	Virgin	5 September 2010	1	7× Platinum
906	Brandon Flowers	Flamingo	Vertigo	12 September 2010	1	Gold
907	The Script	Science & Faith	Phonogenic	19 September 2010	1	2× Platinum
908	Phil Collins	Going Back	Atlantic	26 September 2010	1	Gold
re	The Script	Science & Faith	Phonogenic	3 October 2010	1	2× Platinum
909	Tinie Tempah	Disc-Overy	Parlophone	10 October 2010	1	3× Platinum
910	Robbie Williams	In and Out of Consciousness: Greatest Hits 1990–2010	Virgin	17 October 2010	1	2× Platinum
911	Kings of Leon	Come Around Sundown	Hand Me Down	24 October 2010	2	3× Platinum
912	Cheryl Cole	Messy Little Raindrops	Fascination	7 November 2010	1	Platinum
913	Susan Boyle	The Gift	Syco	14 November 2010	1	2× Platinum
914	Take That	Progress †	Polydor	21 November 2010	6	8× Platinum
2011
915	Rihanna	Loud	Def Jam	2 January 2011	3	8× Platinum
916	Bruno Mars	Doo-Wops & Hooligans	Elektra	23 January 2011	1	8× Platinum
917	Adele	21 ‡	XL	30 January 2011	11	19× Platinum
918	Foo Fighters	Wasting Light	RCA	17 April 2011	1	Platinum
re	Adele	21 ‡	XL	24 April 2011	5	19× Platinum
919	Lady Gaga	Born This Way	Interscope	29 May 2011	2	4× Platinum
920	Arctic Monkeys	Suck It and See	Domino	12 June 2011	1	Platinum
re	Take That	Progress	Polydor	19 June 2011	1	8× Platinum
re	Lady Gaga	Born This Way	Interscope	26 June 2011	1	4× Platinum
921	Beyoncé	4	Columbia/Parkwood	3 July 2011	2	3× Platinum
re	Adele	21 ‡	XL	17 July 2011	2	19× Platinum
re	Amy Winehouse	Back to Black	Island	31 July 2011	3	15× Platinum
922	Nero	Welcome Reality	MTA	21 August 2011	1	Gold
923	Will Young	Echoes	RCA	28 August 2011	1	Platinum
924	Red Hot Chili Peppers	I'm with You	Warner	4 September 2011	1	Gold
925	Example	Playing in the Shadows	Ministry of Sound	11 September 2011	1	Platinum
926	Ed Sheeran	+	Asylum	18 September 2011	1	9× Platinum
927	Kasabian	Velociraptor!	Columbia	25 September 2011	1	2× Platinum
928	James Morrison	The Awakening	Island	2 October 2011	2	Platinum
929	Steps	The Ultimate Collection	Sony	16 October 2011	1	Platinum
930	Noel Gallagher's High Flying Birds	Noel Gallagher's High Flying Birds	Sour Mash	23 October 2011	1	3× Platinum
931	Coldplay	Mylo Xyloto	Parlophone	30 October 2011	1	5× Platinum
932	Florence and the Machine	Ceremonials	Island	6 November 2011	1	3× Platinum
933	Susan Boyle	Someone to Watch Over Me	Syco	13 November 2011	1	Platinum
934	Michael Bublé	Christmas	Reprise	20 November 2011	1	11× Platinum
935	Rihanna	Talk That Talk	Def Jam	27 November 2011	1	3× Platinum
936	Olly Murs	In Case You Didn't Know	Epic	4 December 2011	1	3× Platinum
937	Amy Winehouse	Lioness: Hidden Treasures	Island	11 December 2011	1	3× Platinum
re	Michael Bublé	Christmas	Reprise	18 December 2011	2	11× Platinum
2012
re	Ed Sheeran	+	Asylum	1 January 2012	1	9× Platinum
re	Adele	21 ‡	XL	8 January 2012	1	19× Platinum
re	Bruno Mars	Doo-Wops & Hooligans	Elektra	15 January 2012	1	8× Platinum
re	Adele	21 ‡	XL	22 January 2012	1	19× Platinum
re	Ed Sheeran	+	Asylum	29 January 2012	1	9× Platinum
938	Lana Del Rey	Born to Die	Polydor	5 February 2012	2	6× Platinum
939	Emeli Sandé	Our Version of Events †	Virgin	19 February 2012	1	8× Platinum
re	Adele	21 ‡	XL	26 February 2012	1	19× Platinum
re	Emeli Sandé	Our Version of Events †	Virgin	4 March 2012	1	8× Platinum
940	Bruce Springsteen	Wrecking Ball	Columbia	11 March 2012	1	Gold
941	Military Wives	In My Dreams	Decca	18 March 2012	1	Gold
942	Paul Weller	Sonik Kicks	Island	25 March 2012	1	Silver
943	Madonna	MDNA	Interscope	1 April 2012	1	Gold
944	Nicki Minaj	Pink Friday: Roman Reloaded	Cash Money/Island	8 April 2012	1	Platinum
re	Adele	21 ‡	XL	15 April 2012	2	19× Platinum
945	Jack White	Blunderbuss	XL	29 April 2012	1	Gold
946	Marina and the Diamonds	Electra Heart	679/Atlantic	6 May 2012	1	Gold
947	Keane	Strangeland	Island	13 May 2012	2	Gold
re	Emeli Sandé	Our Version of Events †	Virgin	27 May 2012	1	8× Platinum
948	Gary Barlow	Sing	Decca	3 June 2012	3	Gold
949	Justin Bieber	Believe	Def Jam	24 June 2012	1	Platinum
950	Linkin Park	Living Things	Warner Bros.	1 July 2012	1	Gold
951	Chris Brown	Fortune	RCA	8 July 2012	1	Gold
952	Newton Faulkner	Write It On Your Skin	Ugly Truth	15 July 2012	1	Silver
953	Elton John vs. Pnau	Good Morning to the Night	Mercury	22 July 2012	1	
954	Plan B	Ill Manors	679/Atlantic	29 July 2012	1	Gold
955	Conor Maynard	Contrast	Parlophone	5 August 2012	1	Silver
re	Rihanna	Talk That Talk	Def Jam	12 August 2012	1	3× Platinum
re	Emeli Sandé	Our Version of Events †	Virgin	19 August 2012	2	8× Platinum
956	Rita Ora	Ora	Columbia/Roc Nation	2 September 2012	1	Platinum
957	The Vaccines	Come of Age	Columbia	9 September 2012	1	Platinum
958	The xx	Coexist	Young Turks	16 September 2012	1	Platinum
959	The Killers	Battle Born	Vertigo	23 September 2012	1	Platinum
960	Mumford & Sons	Babel	Gentlemen of the Road/Island	30 September 2012	1	4× Platinum
961	Muse	The 2nd Law	Helium 3/Warner	7 October 2012	1	Platinum
re	Mumford & Sons	Babel	Gentlemen of the Road/Island	14 October 2012	1	4× Platinum
962	Jake Bugg	Jake Bugg	Mercury	21 October 2012	1	3× Platinum
963	Taylor Swift	Red	Big Machine	28 October 2012	1	3× Platinum
964	Calvin Harris	18 Months	Columbia/Fly Eye	4 November 2012	1	4× Platinum
965	Robbie Williams	Take the Crown	Island	11 November 2012	1	Platinum
966	One Direction	Take Me Home	Syco	18 November 2012	1	4× Platinum
967	Rihanna	Unapologetic	Def Jam	25 November 2012	1	3× Platinum
968	Olly Murs	Right Place Right Time	Epic	2 December 2012	2	5× Platinum
969	Bruno Mars	Unorthodox Jukebox	Atlantic	16 December 2012	1	4× Platinum
re	Emeli Sandé	Our Version of Events †	Virgin	23 December 2012	2	8× Platinum
2013
re	Calvin Harris	18 Months	Columbia/Fly Eye	6 January 2013	1	4× Platinum
re	Emeli Sandé	Our Version of Events	Virgin	13 January 2013	1	8× Platinum
970	Motion Picture Cast Recording	Les Misérables	Polydor	20 January 2013	2	2× Platinum
971	Biffy Clyro	Opposites	14th Floor	3 February 2013	1	Platinum
re	Motion Picture Cast Recording	Les Misérables	Polydor	10 February 2013	2	2× Platinum
re	Emeli Sandé	Our Version of Events	Virgin	24 February 2013	2	8× Platinum
972	Bastille	Bad Blood	Virgin	10 March 2013	1	3× Platinum
973	David Bowie	The Next Day	RCA	17 March 2013	1	Platinum
974	Justin Timberlake	The 20/20 Experience	RCA	24 March 2013	3	Platinum
975	Paramore	Paramore	Atlantic/Fueled by Ramen	14 April 2013	1	Platinum
976	Michael Bublé	To Be Loved	Reprise	21 April 2013	2	2× Platinum
977	Rudimental	Home	Asylum	5 May 2013	1	2× Platinum
978	Caro Emerald	The Shocking Miss Emerald	Grandmono/Dramatico	12 May 2013	1	Gold
979	Rod Stewart	Time	Capitol/Decca	19 May 2013	1	2× Platinum
980	Daft Punk	Random Access Memories	Columbia	26 May 2013	2	2× Platinum
981	Disclosure	Settle	PMR	9 June 2013	1	2× Platinum
982	Black Sabbath	13	Vertigo	16 June 2013	1	Gold
983	Kanye West	Yeezus	Def Jam	23 June 2013	1	Gold
984	Tom Odell	Long Way Down	Columbia	30 June 2013	1	Platinum
re	Mumford & Sons	Babel	Gentlemen of the Road/Island	7 July 2013	1	4× Platinum
985	Jay-Z	Magna Carta Holy Grail	Roc Nation	14 July 2013	1	Gold
986	Robin Thicke	Blurred Lines	Interscope	21 July 2013	1	Gold
987	Jahméne Douglas	Love Never Fails	RCA	28 July 2013	1	Silver
988	Richard & Adam	The Impossible Dream	Sony Music	4 August 2013	4	Gold
989	Avenged Sevenfold	Hail to the King	Warner Bros.	1 September 2013	1	Gold
990	The 1975	The 1975	Dirty Hit/Polydor	8 September 2013	1	3× Platinum
991	Arctic Monkeys	AM	Domino	15 September 2013	2	8× Platinum
992	Kings of Leon	Mechanical Bull	RCA	29 September 2013	1	Platinum
993	Haim	Days Are Gone	Polydor	6 October 2013	1	Platinum
994	Miley Cyrus	Bangerz	RCA	13 October 2013	1	Gold
995	John Newman	Tribute	Island	20 October 2013	1	Platinum
996	Katy Perry	Prism	Virgin	27 October 2013	1	Platinum
997	Arcade Fire	Reflektor	Sonovox	3 November 2013	1	Gold
998	Eminem	The Marshall Mathers LP 2	Interscope	10 November 2013	1	3× Platinum
999	Lady Gaga	Artpop	Interscope	17 November 2013	1	Gold
1000	Robbie Williams	Swings Both Ways	Island	24 November 2013	1	2× Platinum
1001	One Direction	Midnight Memories †	Syco	1 December 2013	2	4× Platinum
re	Robbie Williams	Swings Both Ways	Island	15 December 2013	3	2× Platinum
2014
1002	Ellie Goulding	Halcyon	Polydor	5 January 2014	2	4× Platinum
1003	Bruce Springsteen	High Hopes	Columbia	19 January 2014	1	Gold
re	Ellie Goulding	Halcyon	Polydor	26 January 2014	1	4× Platinum
1004	You Me at Six	Cavalier Youth	BMG Rights	2 February 2014	1	Gold
1005	Bombay Bicycle Club	So Long, See You Tomorrow	Island	9 February 2014	1	Gold
1006	Katy B	Little Red	Columbia	16 February 2014	1	Gold
re	Bastille	Bad Blood	Virgin	23 February 2014	2	3× Platinum
1007	Pharrell Williams	Girl	Columbia	9 March 2014	1	Platinum
1008	Elbow	The Take Off and Landing of Everything	Fiction	16 March 2014	1	Gold
1009	George Michael	Symphonica	Virgin EMI	23 March 2014	1	Gold
1010	Sam Bailey	The Power of Love	Sony	30 March 2014	1	Gold
1011	Kaiser Chiefs	Education, Education, Education & War	Fiction	6 April 2014	2	Gold
1012	Paolo Nutini	Caustic Love	Atlantic	20 April 2014	3	2× Platinum
1013	Lily Allen	Sheezus	Parlophone	11 May 2014	1	Gold
1014	Michael Jackson	Xscape	MJJ	18 May 2014	1	Gold
1015	Coldplay	Ghost Stories	Parlophone	25 May 2014	1	2× Platinum
1016	Sam Smith	In the Lonely Hour	Capitol	1 June 2014	2	10× Platinum
1017	Kasabian	48:13	Columbia/Sony	15 June 2014	1	Platinum
1018	Lana Del Rey	Ultraviolence	Interscope/Polydor	22 June 2014	1	Platinum
1019	Ed Sheeran	x †	Asylum/Atlantic	29 June 2014	8	13× Platinum
1020	Collabro	Stars	Syco	24 August 2014	1	Gold
1021	Royal Blood	Royal Blood	Warner Bros.	31 August 2014	1	2× Platinum
re	Sam Smith	In the Lonely Hour	Capitol	7 September 2014	2	10× Platinum
1022	The Script	No Sound Without Silence	Columbia	21 September 2014	1	Platinum
1023	alt-J	This Is All Yours	Infectious	28 September 2014	1	Gold
1024	George Ezra	Wanted on Voyage	Columbia	5 October 2014	2	5× Platinum
1025	Ella Henderson	Chapter One	Syco	19 October 2014	1	Platinum
1026	Ben Howard	I Forget Where We Were	Island	26 October 2014	1	Gold
1027	Taylor Swift	1989	Big Machine	2 November 2014	1	6× Platinum
re	Ed Sheeran	x †	Asylum/Atlantic	9 November 2014	1	13× Platinum
1028	Pink Floyd	The Endless River	Parlophone	16 November 2014	1	Platinum
1029	One Direction	Four	Columbia/Syco	23 November 2014	1	3× Platinum
1030	Olly Murs	Never Been Better	Syco/Epic	30 November 2014	1	3× Platinum
1031	Take That	III	Polydor	7 December 2014	1	Platinum
re	Ed Sheeran	x †	Asylum/Atlantic	14 December 2014	3	13× Platinum
2015
re	George Ezra	Wanted on Voyage	Columbia	4 January 2015	1	5× Platinum
re	Sam Smith	In the Lonely Hour	Capitol	11 January 2015	1	10× Platinum
re	George Ezra	Wanted on Voyage	Columbia	18 January 2015	1	5× Platinum
1032	Mark Ronson	Uptown Special	Columbia	25 January 2015	1	Gold
1033	Meghan Trainor	Title	Epic	1 February 2015	1	Platinum
1034	Bob Dylan	Shadows in the Night	Columbia	8 February 2015	1	
re	Sam Smith	In the Lonely Hour	Capitol	15 February 2015	1	10× Platinum
1035	Imagine Dragons	Smoke + Mirrors	Interscope	22 February 2015	1	Platinum
re	Sam Smith	In the Lonely Hour	Capitol	1 March 2015	1	10× Platinum
1036	Noel Gallagher's High Flying Birds	Chasing Yesterday	Sour Mash	8 March 2015	1	Platinum
re	Sam Smith	In the Lonely Hour	Capitol	15 March 2015	1	10× Platinum
1037	Kendrick Lamar	To Pimp a Butterfly	Interscope	22 March 2015	1	Platinum
1038	James Bay	Chaos and the Calm	Virgin	29 March 2015	1	3× Platinum
1039	The Prodigy	The Day Is My Enemy	Cooking Vinyl	5 April 2015	1	Gold
1040	All Time Low	Future Hearts	Hopeless	12 April 2015	1	Silver
1041	Paul Simon	The Ultimate Collection	Sony	19 April 2015	1	2× Platinum
1042	Josh Groban	Stages	Reprise	26 April 2015	1	Gold
1043	Blur	The Magic Whip	Parlophone	3 May 2015	1	Gold
1044	Mumford & Sons	Wilder Mind	Gentlemen of the Road/Island	10 May 2015	2	Platinum
1045	Brandon Flowers	The Desired Effect	Vertigo	24 May 2015	1	Gold
1046	Will Young	85% Proof	Island	31 May 2015	1	Gold
1047	Florence and the Machine	How Big, How Blue, How Beautiful	Island	7 June 2015	1	Platinum
1048	Muse	Drones	Warner Bros.	14 June 2015	2	Gold
re	Florence and the Machine	How Big, How Blue, How Beautiful	Island	28 June 2015	1	Platinum
1049	Lionel Richie	The Definitive Collection	Motown	5 July 2015	1	5× Platinum
re	Ed Sheeran	x	Asylum/Atlantic	10 July 2015	1	13× Platinum
1050	Years & Years	Communion	Polydor	17 July 2015	2	2× Platinum
1051	The Chemical Brothers	Born in the Echoes	Virgin	31 July 2015	1	Silver
1052	The Maccabees	Marks to Prove It	Polydor	7 August 2015	1	Silver
1053	Dr. Dre	Compton	Interscope	14 August 2015	1	Gold
1054	Cilla Black	The Very Best of Cilla Black	Parlophone	21 August 2015	1	Platinum
1055	Jess Glynne	I Cry When I Laugh	Atlantic	28 August 2015	1	5× Platinum
1056	The Weeknd	Beauty Behind the Madness	Republic	4 September 2015	1	2× Platinum
1057	Iron Maiden	The Book of Souls	Parlophone	11 September 2015	1	Gold
1058	Stereophonics	Keep the Village Alive	Stylus	18 September 2015	1	Gold
1059	David Gilmour	Rattle That Lock	Columbia	25 September 2015	1	Gold
1060	Disclosure	Caracal	Island	2 October 2015	1	Gold
1061	Rudimental	We the Generation	Atlantic	9 October 2015	1	Gold
1062	Faithless	Faithless 2.0	Sony	16 October 2015	1	Silver
1063	Jamie Lawson	Jamie Lawson	Atlantic	23 October 2015	1	Gold
1064	5 Seconds of Summer	Sounds Good Feels Good	Capitol	30 October 2015	1	Gold
1065	Elvis Presley with the Royal Philharmonic Orchestra	If I Can Dream	RCA	6 November 2015	2	4× Platinum
1066	One Direction	Made in the A.M.	Columbia/Syco	20 November 2015	1	2× Platinum
1067	Adele	25 †	XL	27 November 2015	7	14× Platinum
2016
1068	David Bowie	Blackstar	RCA	15 January 2016	3	Platinum
1069	David Bowie	Best of Bowie	EMI	5 February 2016	1	4× Platinum
1070	Coldplay	A Head Full of Dreams	Parlophone	12 February 2016	1	4× Platinum
re	Adele	25 †	XL	19 February 2016	2	14× Platinum
1071	The 1975	I Like It When You Sleep, for You Are So Beautiful Yet So Unaware of It	Dirty Hit/Polydor	4 March 2016	1	Platinum
re	Adele	25 †	XL	11 March 2016	3	14× Platinum
1072	Zayn	Mind of Mine	RCA	1 April 2016	1	Gold
1073	The Last Shadow Puppets	Everything You've Come to Expect	Domino	8 April 2016	1	Gold
1074	The Lumineers	Cleopatra	Dualtone	15 April 2016	1	Gold
1075	PJ Harvey	The Hope Six Demolition Project	Island	22 April 2016	1	
1076	Beyoncé	Lemonade	Parkwood/Columbia	29 April 2016	1	2× Platinum
1077	Drake	Views	Young Money/Republic	6 May 2016	1	3× Platinum
1078	Radiohead	A Moon Shaped Pool	XL	13 May 2016	1	Platinum
re	Drake	Views	Young Money/Republic	20 May 2016	1	3× Platinum
1079	Ariana Grande	Dangerous Woman	Republic	27 May 2016	1	2× Platinum
1080	Catfish and the Bottlemen	The Ride	Capitol	3 June 2016	1	Platinum
1081	Paul Simon	Stranger to Stranger	Concord	10 June 2016	1	Silver
1082	Rick Astley	50	BMG	17 June 2016	1	Platinum
re	Radiohead	A Moon Shaped Pool	XL	24 June 2016	1	Platinum
re	Adele	25 †	XL	1 July 2016	1	14× Platinum
1083	Blink-182	California	BMG	8 July 2016	1	Gold
1084	Biffy Clyro	Ellipsis	14th Floor	15 July 2016	1	Gold
1085	Michael Kiwanuka	Love & Hate	Polydor	22 July 2016	1	Gold
1086	Electric Light Orchestra	All Over the World: The Very Best of Electric Light Orchestra	Sony	29 July 2016	1	5× Platinum
1087	Viola Beach	Viola Beach	Fuller Beans	5 August 2016	1	Silver
1088	Blossoms	Blossoms	Virgin	12 August 2016	2	Gold
1089	Frank Ocean	Blonde	Boys Don't Cry	26 August 2016	1	2× Platinum
1090	Barbra Streisand	Encore: Movie Partners Sing Broadway	Columbia	2 September 2016	1	
1091	Ward Thomas	Cartwheels	WTW Music	9 September 2016	1	Gold
1092	Bastille	Wild World	Virgin EMI	16 September 2016	2	Gold
1093	Passenger	Young as the Morning, Old as the Sea	Nettwerk	30 September 2016	1	Silver
1094	Craig David	Following My Intuition	Insanity	7 October 2016	1	Gold
1095	Green Day	Revolution Radio	Reprise	14 October 2016	1	Gold
1096	Kings of Leon	Walls	RCA	21 October 2016	1	Platinum
1097	Elvis Presley with the Royal Philharmonic Orchestra	The Wonder of You	RCA	28 October 2016	1	2× Platinum
1098	James Arthur	Back from the Edge	Columbia	4 November 2016	1	Platinum
1099	Robbie Williams	The Heavy Entertainment Show	Columbia	11 November 2016	1	Platinum
1100	Olly Murs	24 Hrs	Sony	18 November 2016	1	Platinum
1101	Little Mix	Glory Days	Syco	25 November 2016	2	4× Platinum
1102	The Rolling Stones	Blue & Lonesome	Polydor	9 December 2016	1	Platinum
1103	Michael Ball and Alfie Boe	Together	Decca	16 December 2016	2	2× Platinum
re	Little Mix	Glory Days	Syco	30 December 2016	3	4× Platinum
2017
1104	The xx	I See You	Young Turks	20 January 2017	1	Gold
1105	Pete Tong, The Heritage Orchestra and Jules Buckley	Classic House	Universal	27 January 2017	1	Gold
1106	Various artists	La La Land: Original Motion Picture Soundtrack	Interscope	3 February 2017	1	Gold
1107	Elbow	Little Fictions	Polydor	10 February 2017	1	Gold
1108	Rag'n'Bone Man	Human	Columbia	17 February 2017	2	4× Platinum
1109	Stormzy	Gang Signs & Prayer	Merky	3 March 2017	1	Platinum
1110	Ed Sheeran	÷ †	Asylum/Atlantic	10 March 2017	9	15× Platinum
1111	Kasabian	For Crying Out Loud	Columbia	12 May 2017	1	Gold
1112	Harry Styles	Harry Styles	Erskine/Columbia	19 May 2017	1	2× Platinum
re	Ed Sheeran	÷ †	Asylum/Atlantic	26 May 2017	1	15× Platinum
re	The Beatles	Sgt. Pepper's Lonely Hearts Club Band	Parlophone	2 June 2017	1	18× Platinum
re	Ed Sheeran	÷ †	Asylum/Atlantic	9 June 2017	1	15× Platinum
1113	London Grammar	Truth Is a Beautiful Thing	Metal & Dust/Ministry of Sound	16 June 2017	1	Gold
1114	Royal Blood	How Did We Get So Dark?	Warner Bros.	23 June 2017	1	Gold
re	Ed Sheeran	÷ †	Asylum/Atlantic	30 June 2017	3	15× Platinum
1115	The Vamps	Night & Day	Mercury/Virgin EMI	21 July 2017	1	Gold
1116	Lana Del Rey	Lust for Life	Polydor/Interscope	28 July 2017	1	Gold
1117	Arcade Fire	Everything Now	Columbia/Sonovox	4 August 2017	1	Gold
re	Ed Sheeran	÷ †	Asylum/Atlantic	11 August 2017	3	15× Platinum
1118	Queens of the Stone Age	Villains	Matador	1 September 2017	1	Gold
1119	The Script	Freedom Child	Columbia/Sony	8 September 2017	1	Gold
1120	The National	Sleep Well Beast	4AD	15 September 2017	1	Silver
1121	Foo Fighters	Concrete and Gold	RCA	22 September 2017	1	Gold
1122	The Killers	Wonderful Wonderful	Island	29 September 2017	1	Gold
1123	Shania Twain	Now	Mercury Nashville	6 October 2017	1	Silver
1124	Liam Gallagher	As You Were	Warner Bros.	13 October 2017	1	Platinum
1125	Pink	Beautiful Trauma	RCA	20 October 2017	1	2× Platinum
1126	George Michael	Listen Without Prejudice Vol. 1 / MTV Unplugged	Columbia	27 October 2017	1	
1127	Michael Ball and Alfie Boe	Together Again	Decca	3 November 2017	1	Platinum
1128	Sam Smith	The Thrill of It All	Capitol	10 November 2017	1	2× Platinum
1129	Taylor Swift	Reputation	Big Machine	17 November 2017	1	3× Platinum
1130	Paloma Faith	The Architect	RCA, Epic	24 November 2017	1	Platinum
1131	Noel Gallagher's High Flying Birds	Who Built the Moon?	Sour Mash	1 December 2017	1	Platinum
re	Sam Smith	The Thrill of It All	Capitol	8 December 2017	1	2× Platinum
re	Ed Sheeran	÷ †	Asylum/Atlantic	15 December 2017	1	15× Platinum
1132	Eminem	Revival	Interscope	22 December 2017	1	Platinum
re	Ed Sheeran	÷ †	Asylum/Atlantic	29 December 2017	2	15× Platinum
2018
1133	Hugh Jackman & Various artists	The Greatest Showman †	Atlantic	12 January 2018	11	10× Platinum
1134	George Ezra	Staying at Tamara's	Columbia	30 March 2018	1	4× Platinum
re	Hugh Jackman & Various artists	The Greatest Showman †	Atlantic	6 April 2018	1	10× Platinum
1135	Kylie Minogue	Golden	BMG	13 April 2018	1	Gold
re	Hugh Jackman & Various artists	The Greatest Showman †	Atlantic	20 April 2018	2	10× Platinum
1136	Post Malone	Beerbongs & Bentleys	Republic	4 May 2018	1	2× Platinum
re	Hugh Jackman & Various artists	The Greatest Showman †	Atlantic	11 May 2018	1	10× Platinum
1137	Arctic Monkeys	Tranquility Base Hotel & Casino	Domino	18 May 2018	1	Gold
re	Hugh Jackman & Various artists	The Greatest Showman †	Atlantic	25 May 2018	6	10× Platinum
1138	Drake	Scorpion	Young Money/Republic	6 July 2018	3	2× Platinum
1139	Various artists	Mamma Mia! Here We Go Again: The Movie Soundtrack	Polydor	27 July 2018	4	2× Platinum
1140	Ariana Grande	Sweetener	Republic	24 August 2018	1	Platinum
re	Various artists	Mamma Mia! Here We Go Again: The Movie Soundtrack	Polydor	31 August 2018	1	2× Platinum
1141	Eminem	Kamikaze	Interscope	7 September 2018	4	Platinum
1142	Rod Stewart	Blood Red Roses	Decca	5 October 2018	1	Gold
1143	Lady Gaga and Bradley Cooper	A Star Is Born	Interscope	12 October 2018	1	2× Platinum
1144	Jess Glynne	Always in Between	Atlantic	19 October 2018	1	2× Platinum
re	Lady Gaga and Bradley Cooper	A Star Is Born	Interscope	26 October 2018	1	2× Platinum
1145	Andrea Bocelli	Sì	Decca	2 November 2018	1	Gold
1146	The Prodigy	No Tourists	BMG	9 November 2018	1	Silver
1147	Muse	Simulation Theory	Helium 3/Warner Bros.	16 November 2018	1	Gold
1148	Michael Bublé	Love	Reprise	23 November 2018	1	Platinum
1149	Take That	Odyssey	Polydor	30 November 2018	1	Platinum
1150	The 1975	A Brief Inquiry into Online Relationships	Dirty Hit/Polydor	7 December 2018	1	Platinum
re	Hugh Jackman & Various artists	The Greatest Showman †	Atlantic	14 December 2018	7	10× Platinum
2019
1151	Bring Me the Horizon	Amo	RCA	1 February 2019	1	Gold
1152	The Specials	Encore	UMG	8 February 2019	1	
1153	Ariana Grande	Thank U, Next	Republic	15 February 2019	3	2× Platinum
1154	Tom Walker	What a Time to Be Alive	Relentless	8 March 2019	1	Platinum
1155	Dave	Psychodrama	Dave/Neighbourhood	15 March 2019	1	2× Platinum
1156	Jack Savoretti	Singing to Strangers	BMG	22 March 2019	1	Silver
1157	Michael Ball	Coming Home to You	Decca	29 March 2019	1	
1158	Billie Eilish	When We All Fall Asleep, Where Do We Go?	Interscope	5 April 2019	2	3× Platinum
1159	BTS	Map of the Soul: Persona	Big Hit	19 April 2019	1	Gold
re	Billie Eilish	When We All Fall Asleep, Where Do We Go?	Interscope	26 April 2019	1	3× Platinum
1160	Pink	Hurts 2B Human	RCA	3 May 2019	3	Gold
1161	Lewis Capaldi	Divinely Uninspired to a Hellish Extent †	EMI	24 May 2019	4	6× Platinum
1162	Bruce Springsteen	Western Stars	Columbia	21 June 2019	1	Gold
re	Lewis Capaldi	Divinely Uninspired to a Hellish Extent †	EMI	28 June 2019	1	6× Platinum
1163	Kylie Minogue	Step Back in Time: The Definitive Collection	BMG	5 July 2019	1	Platinum
re	Lewis Capaldi	Divinely Uninspired to a Hellish Extent †	EMI	12 July 2019	1	6× Platinum
1164	Ed Sheeran	No.6 Collaborations Project	Asylum	19 July 2019	4	3× Platinum
1165	Slipknot	We Are Not Your Kind	Roadrunner	16 August 2019	1	Gold
re	Ed Sheeran	No.6 Collaborations Project	Asylum	23 August 2019	1	3× Platinum
1166	Taylor Swift	Lover	Republic	30 August 2019	1	3× Platinum
1167	Lana Del Rey	Norman Fucking Rockwell!	Polydor	6 September 2019	1	Platinum
1168	Post Malone	Hollywood's Bleeding	Republic	13 September 2019	1	2× Platinum
1169	Sam Fender	Hypersonic Missiles	Polydor	20 September 2019	1	2× Platinum
1170	Liam Gallagher	Why Me? Why Not.	Warner	27 September 2019	1	Gold
re	The Beatles	Abbey Road	Apple Corps	4 October 2019	1	8× Platinum
1171	Dermot Kennedy	Without Fear	Island	11 October 2019	1	Platinum
1172	Elbow	Giants of All Sizes	Polydor	18 October 2019	1	Silver
1173	Foals	Everything Not Saved Will Be Lost – Part 2	Warner	25 October 2019	1	Silver
1174	Stereophonics	Kind	Parlophone	1 November 2019	1	Gold
1175	Jeff Lynne's ELO	From Out of Nowhere	RCA	8 November 2019	1	Silver
1176	The Script	Sunsets & Full Moons	Columbia	15 November 2019	1	Silver
1177	Westlife	Spectrum	EMI	22 November 2019	1	Gold
1178	Coldplay	Everyday Life	Parlophone	29 November 2019	1	Platinum
1179	Robbie Williams	The Christmas Present	Columbia	6 December 2019	1	Gold
1180	Rod Stewart and the Royal Philharmonic Orchestra	You're in My Heart: Rod Stewart with the Royal Philharmonic Orchestra	Rhino	13 December 2019	3	Platinum

=== Artists with the most number ones in the 2010s ===
Eighteen different artists had three number ones on the UK Albums Chart during the 2010s, whilst eight artists have had four number ones. In 2012, Rihanna became the first artist to have three albums reach number one: Loud, which spent three weeks at number one; Talk That Talk, which spent two weeks at number one, and Unapologetic, which spent one week at number one. One Direction gained their fourth UK number-one album in 2015, followed by Robbie Williams and Olly Murs in 2016. Eminem, Lady Gaga, Ed Sheeran, Taylor Swift, Lana Del Rey and Coldplay later scored their fourth chart-toppers of the decade as well. In December 2019, Williams' album The Christmas Present claimed the number 1 spot, making him the first artist of the decade to have five number-one albums and the artist with the most-chart topping albums for the second consecutive decade.

Artist	Number ones	Albums
Robbie Williams	5	List: 1. In and Out of Consciousness: Greatest Hits 1990–2010 (2010); 2. Take the Crown (2012); 3. Swings Both Ways (2013); 4. The Heavy Entertainment Show (2016); 5. The Christmas Present (2019)
Coldplay	4	List: 1. Mylo Xyloto (2011); 2. Ghost Stories (2014); 3. A Head Full of Dreams (2016); 4. Everyday Life (2019)
Lana Del Rey	4	List: 1. Born to Die (2012); 2. Ultraviolence (2014); 3. Lust for Life (2017); 4. Norman Fucking Rockwell! (2019)
Eminem	4	List: 1. Recovery (2010); 2. The Marshall Mathers LP 2 (2013); 3. Revival (2017); 4. Kamikaze (2018)
Lady Gaga	4	List: 1. The Fame (2009)†; 2. Born This Way (2011); 3. Artpop (2013); 4. A Star Is Born (2018)
Olly Murs	4	List: 1. In Case You Didn't Know (2011); 2. Right Place Right Time (2012); 3. Never Been Better (2014); 4. 24 Hrs (2016)
One Direction	4	List: 1. Take Me Home (2012); 2. Midnight Memories (2013); 3. Four (2014); 4. Made in the A.M. (2015)
The Script	4	List: 1. Science & Faith (2010); 2. No Sound Without Silence (2014); 3. Freedom Child (2017); 4. Sunsets & Full Moons (2019)
Ed Sheeran	4	List: 1. + (2011); 2. x (2014); 3. ÷ (2017); 4. No.6 Collaborations Project (2019)
Taylor Swift	4	List: 1. Red (2012); 2. 1989 (2014); 3. Reputation (2017); 4. Lover (2019)
Arcade Fire	3	List: 1. The Suburbs (2010); 2. Reflektor (2013); 3. Everything Now (2017)
Arctic Monkeys	3	List: 1. Suck It and See (2011); 2. AM (2013); 3. Tranquility Base Hotel & Casino (2018)
David Bowie	3	List: 1. The Next Day (2013); 2. Blackstar (2016); 3. Best of Bowie (2002)†
Michael Bublé	3	List: 1. Christmas (2011); 2. To Be Loved (2013); 3. Love (2018)
Elbow	3	List: 1. The Take Off and Landing of Everything (2014); 2. Little Fictions (2017); 3. Giants of All Sizes (2019)
Florence and the Machine	3	List: 1. Lungs (2009)†; 2. Ceremonials (2011); 3. How Big, How Blue, How Beautiful (2015)
Ariana Grande	3	List: 1. Dangerous Woman (2016); 2. Sweetener (2018); 3. Thank U, Next (2019)
Kasabian	3	List: 1. Velociraptor! (2011); 2. 48:13 (2014); 3. For Crying Out Loud (2017)
Kings of Leon	3	List: 1. Come Around Sundown (2010); 2. Mechanical Bull (2013); 3. WALLS (2016)
Kylie Minogue	3	List: 1. Aphrodite (2010); 2. Golden (2018); 3. Step Back in Time: The Definitive Collection (2019)
Muse	3	List: 1. The 2nd Law (2012); 2. Drones (2015); 3. Simulation Theory (2018)
Noel Gallagher's High Flying Birds	3	List: 1. Noel Gallagher's High Flying Birds (2011); 2. Chasing Yesterday (2015); 3. Who Built the Moon? (2017)
Rihanna	3	List: 1. Loud (2010); 2. Talk That Talk (2011); 3. Unapologetic (2012)
Bruce Springsteen	3	List: 1. Wrecking Ball (2012); 2. High Hopes (2014); 3. Western Stars (2019)
Rod Stewart	3	List: 1. Time (2013); 2. Blood Red Roses (2018); 3. You're in My Heart: Rod Stewart with the Royal Philharmonic Orchestra (2019)
Take That	3	List: 1. Progress (2010); 2. III (2014); 3. Odyssey (2018)
The 1975	3	List: 1. The 1975 (2013); 2. I Like It When You Sleep, for You Are So Beautiful Yet So Unaware of It (2016); 3. A Brief Inquiry into Online Relationships (2018)

- † Originally released in the 2000s, but went to number one during the 2010s.

=== Albums with the most weeks at number one ===
The following albums spent at least seven weeks at number one during the 2010s.

Artist	Album	Weeks at number one
Hugh Jackman & Various artists	The Greatest Showman	28
Adele	21	23
Ed Sheeran	÷	20
Adele	25	13
Ed Sheeran	x	13
Emeli Sandé	Our Version of Events	10
Sam Smith	In the Lonely Hour	8
Take That	Progress	7
Eminem	Recovery	7

=== Artists with the most weeks at number one ===
Twenty different artists spent five weeks or more at number one on the album chart during the 2010s. Ed Sheeran spent the most weeks at number one, with a total of 41 weeks.

Artist	Weeks at number one	Albums
Ed Sheeran	41	List: 1. + (3 weeks); 2. x (13 weeks); 3. ÷ (20 weeks); 4. No.6 Collaborations Project (5 weeks)
Adele	36	List: 1. 21 (23 weeks); 2. 25 (13 weeks)
Eminem	13	List: 1. Recovery (7 weeks); 2. The Marshall Mathers LP 2 (1 week); 3. Revival (1 week); 4. Kamikaze (4 weeks)
Emeli Sandé	10	List: 1. Our Version of Events (10 weeks)
Sam Smith	10	List: 1. In the Lonely Hour (8 weeks); 2. The Thrill of It All (2 weeks)
Lady Gaga	9	List: 1. The Fame (3 weeks); 2. Born This Way (3 weeks); 3. Artpop (1 week); 4. A Star Is Born (2 weeks)
Take That	9	List: 1. Progress (7 weeks); 2. III (1 week); 3. Odyssey (1 week)
Robbie Williams	7	List: 1. In and Out of Consciousness: Greatest Hits 1990–2010 (1 week); 2. Take the Crown (1 week); 3. Swings Both Ways (3 weeks); 4. The Heavy Entertainment Show (1 week); 5. The Christmas Present (1 week)
Michael Bublé	6	List: 1. Crazy Love (1 week); 2. Christmas (4 weeks); 3. Love (1 week)
Lewis Capaldi	6	List: 1. Divinely Uninspired to a Hellish Extent (6 weeks)
Paolo Nutini	6	List: 1. Sunny Side Up (3 weeks); 2. Caustic Love (3 weeks)
Rihanna	6	List: 1. Loud (3 weeks); 2. Talk That Talk (2 weeks); 3. Unapologetic (1 weeks)
David Bowie	5	List: 1. The Next Day (1 week); 2. Blackstar (3 weeks); 3. Best of Bowie (1 week)
Lana Del Rey	5	List: 1. Born to Die (2 weeks); 2. Ultraviolence (1 week); 3. Lust for Life (1 week); 4. Norman Fucking Rockwell (1 week)
Drake	5	List: 1. Views (2 weeks); 2. Scorpion (3 weeks)
George Ezra	5	List: 1. Wanted on Voyage (4 weeks); 2. Staying at Tamara's (1 week)
Florence and the Machine	5	List: 1. Lungs (2 weeks); 2. Ceremonials (1 week); 3. How Big, How Blue, How Beautiful (2 weeks)
Ariana Grande	5	List: 1. Dangerous Woman (1 week); 2. Sweetener (1 week); 3. Thank U, Next (3 weeks)
Little Mix	5	List: 1. Glory Days (5 weeks)
Olly Murs	5	List: 1. In Case You Didn't Know (1 week); 2. Right Place Right Time (1 week); 3. Never Been Better (2 weeks); 4. 24 Hrs (1 week)
One Direction	5	List: 1. Take Me Home (1 week); 2. Midnight Memories (2 weeks); 3. Four (1 week); 4. Made in the A.M. (1 week)
Rod Stewart	5	List: 1. Time (1 week); 2. Blood Red Roses (1 week); 3. You're in My Heart: Rod Stewart with the Royal Philharmonic Orchestra (3 weeks)

=== By record label ===
Thirteen different record labels have spent five weeks or more at number one on the album chart so far during the 2010s.

Record label	Number-one albums	Weeks at number one
XL Recordings	4	39
Polydor Records	14	29
Atlantic Records	12	29
Island Records	17	26
Virgin Records	9	25
Columbia Records	18	23
RCA Records	15	20
Interscope Records	11	20
Parlophone	11	11
Syco Music	8	10
Sony Music	7	10
Def Jam Recordings	5	8
Reprise Records	4	7

== Christmas number ones ==
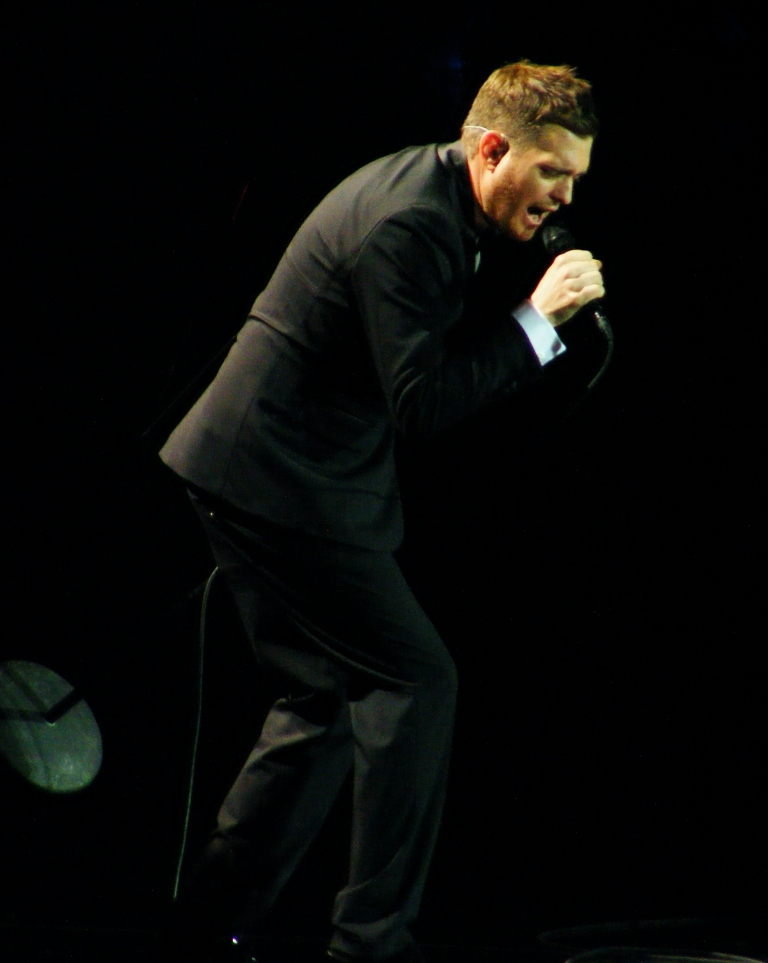
Michael Bublé earned the Christmas number-one in 2011 with his staple album Christmas.

In the UK, Christmas number one albums are those that are at the top of the UK Albums Chart on Christmas Day. Typically, this will refer to the album that was announced as number one on the Sunday before 25 December—when Christmas Day falls on a Sunday itself, the official number one is considered by the OCC to be the one announced on that day's chart. During the 2010s, the following albums were Christmas number ones.

Year	Artist	Album	Record label	Weeks at number one	Ref.
2010	Take That	Progress	Polydor	7	
2011	Michael Bublé	Christmas	143/Reprise	4	
2012	Emeli Sandé	Our Version of Events	Virgin	10	
2013	Robbie Williams	Swings Both Ways	Island	4	
2014	Ed Sheeran	X	Asylum	13	
2015	Adele	25	XL	13	
2016	Michael Ball & Alfie Boe	Together	Decca	2	
2017	Eminem	Revival	Interscope	1	
2018	Various Artists	The Greatest Showman	Atlantic	28	
2019	Rod Stewart with the Royal Philharmonic Orchestra	You're in My Heart: Rod Stewart with the Royal Philharmonic Orchestra	Warner	3	

== See also ==
- List of UK Album Downloads Chart number ones of the 2010s
- List of UK Compilation Chart number ones of the 2010s
- List of UK Singles Chart number ones of the 2010s
