= Can't Stop Christmas =

2020 song by Robbie Williams

Single by Robbie Williams

from the album The Christmas Present
- Released: 20 November 2020
- Genre: Christmas
- Length: 3:23
- Label: Columbia
- Songwriters: Robert Williams Karl Brazil; Owen Parker: Chris Heath; Benjamin Roy Castle
- Producers: Guy Chambers; Richard Flack

Robbie Williams singles chronology
"Strange Days" (2020)	"Can't Stop Christmas" (2020)	"Angels (XXV)" (2022)

"Can't Stop Christmas" is a song by British singer-songwriter Robbie Williams, released as the second single from his twelfth studio album The Christmas Present (2019). The track was not on the original release of the album but was added as the opening track on the second CD of the 2020 reissue. The single was released in the United Kingdom on 20 November 2020. The song was written by Williams, Karl Brazil, Owen Parker, Benjamin Roy Castle and Chris Heath and produced by Guy Chambers and Richard Flack.

== Background ==
Williams released his twelfth studio album The Christmas Present on 22 November 2019. On the same day he also released the first single from the album, "Time for Change", with an accompanying music video.

The second single from the album, "Can't Stop Christmas", was released on 20 November 2020.

Williams stated: "It was a lot of fun to write and I hope we got the tone right and I hope that it just makes people smile. I hope people find it mildly amusing and uplifting." He added that the days of him being up in the singles charts have moved on: "I'm an albums kind of person now, which is wonderful. But I don’t even look at the charts now. And I wouldn’t even think that I would get anywhere near up there. But if I did, it would be a Christmas miracle and I'd be very grateful."

In an interview with the Irish Independent, Williams stated: "I was made to write the song by my wife, I had written 50 songs for The Christmas Present and I didn’t want to do any more but she said, ‘You’re missing a trick. Look, you know, you’ve got to document what’s going on in the world right now — and do it with some humour." He added "I said, ‘I’m not doing that because all the musicians in the world are going to be doing that right now and I can’t be bothered, thank you very much’. And then she made me and then she gave me the title and some of the lyrics. So, it's kinda Ayda Williams's project lived out by me."

== Reception ==
"Can't Stop Christmas" was included on a list of the worst songs of 2020 published by Variety, with the song described as a "holiday-spirit-killing hokum".

== Music video ==
An accompanying music video directed by Dan Massie was released on 14 December 2020. The video sees Williams parodying the British government's response to the COVID-19 pandemic. Williams appears as Boris Johnson in the video, which also includes a dancing Theresa May and a tribute to Queen's "Bohemian Rhapsody".

== Charts ==
Chart performance for "Can't Stop Christmas"
Chart (2020–2023)	Peak position
Austria (Ö3 Austria Top 40)	71
Belgium (Ultratip Bubbling Under Flanders)	2
Belgium (Ultratip Bubbling Under Wallonia)	29
Germany (GfK)	59
Sweden Heatseeker (Sverigetopplistan)	19
UK Singles Downloads (Official Charts)	9
