= Time for a Change =

Time for a Change may refer to:

- Time for a Change (book), a 1993 book by Richard Bandler
- Time for a Change (album), a 2007 album by R&B artist Cupid

== See also ==
- Time for Change (disambiguation)
