= The Christmas Present =

Studio album by Robbie Williams
- Released: 22 November 2019
- Recorded: June–September 2019
- Studios: Los Angeles, California; Las Vegas, Nevada; London, England; Vancouver, Canada
- Genre: Christmas
- Length: 78:26
- Label: Columbia
- Producers: Guy Chambers; Richard Flack

Robbie Williams chronology
Under the Radar Volume 3 (2019)	The Christmas Present (2019)	XXV (2022)

Singles from The Christmas Present
- 1. "Time for Change" Released: 22 November 2019; 2. "Can't Stop Christmas" Released: 20 November 2020

The Christmas Present is the twelfth studio album by English singer-songwriter Robbie Williams, and his first studio album since 2016's The Heavy Entertainment Show. It was released on 22 November 2019, and features guest appearances from Tyson Fury, Rod Stewart, Jamie Cullum, Helene Fischer and Bryan Adams. Williams performed a pair of concerts dubbed "The Robbie Williams Christmas Party" at the SSE Arena on 16 and 17 December 2019 in promotion of the album.

== Background ==
In a Q&A with BBC Radio 2 in December 2012, Williams was asked if he would consider doing a Christmas album. "You bet", Williams stated. "I used to hate Christmas, but my wife Ayda has instilled me with Christmas spirit. It used to be a time of year that I didn't care too much for, but she loves it, loves it like a child, and because of that, I now love it, it's a very very special time of the year, and because of that, yes I'm willing to do a Christmas album, and I will do one at one point".

Williams began recording the album in June 2019, just before the final leg of his Wynn Las Vegas residency, and concluded in Vancouver in October 2019. Williams joked that he was going to call the album Achtung Bublé, a play on words of the U2 album "Achtung Baby", and in reference to Michael Bublé's "monopoly" on the Christmas music market, which he said "must end now". Williams was asked in an interview whether or not there were any plans for Bublé to sing on the album and he answered: "He sang with me on an album of mine called Swings Both Ways. You sort of get it in your head that you can only use that token once. I might be wrong. I should have got him involved.">

In an interview with Smooth FM, Williams stated: "I wrote 50 songs for the Christmas Present record. And you can’t write 50 songs in one month because it’s Christmas and you feel Christmassy, so you have to do it when the fancy takes you."

Williams initially aspired to cover "Fairytale of New York" as a duet with Britney Spears which the latter declined due to being on hiatus.

== Critical reception ==
Professional ratings
Aggregate scores
Source	Rating
Metacritic	52/100
Review scores
Source	Rating
AllMusic	3/5 stars
NME	3/5 stars

The Christmas Present received mixed reviews from music critics. At Metacritic, which assigns a normalised rating out of 100 to reviews from mainstream critics, the album has an average score of 52 based on 4 reviews, indicating "mixed or average reviews".

Jordan Bassett of NME rated the album 3/5 stars, writing: "The original compositions are richer than the covers. The galloping 'Darkest Night' opens with the fabulous line "December in London / Think I’ve just been made redundant" and the optimistic 'New Year's Day' borrows quite liberally from George Michael's 'Freedom' on a jubilant bridge where Robbie and a gospel choir rapturously exclaim, "Oh! It’s an energy! Oh! The memories!""

The song "Bad Sharon", featuring Tyson Fury on guest vocals, was called a "favourite" to be the UK Christmas number one.

== Singles ==
"Time for Change" was released as the album's official lead single on 22 November 2019.

The album's second single, "Can't Stop Christmas", was released on 20 November 2020.

== Commercial performance ==
The Christmas Present opened at number two on the UK Albums Chart, behind Coldplay's Everyday Life. The album sold 67,000 copies in the UK during its first week, the same amount as Williams' previous album The Heavy Entertainment Show (2016). Despite not getting to number one during its first week on the charts, Williams had the fastest selling cassette release in over two decades. The Christmas Present sold over 10,000 cassettes in its first seven days of release. Halfway through its second week, the album climbed to number one, outselling Rod Stewart's album You're in My Heart by 5,000 copies and becoming Williams' 13th number one, tying Elvis Presley for the most UK number one albums. In its second week, 57,000 copies had been sold. Williams now ties Presley for the most #1's in a solo career, and has 17 number one albums when including his Take That career.

The Christmas Present opened at number two on the Australian music chart, behind Coldplay's Everyday Life. The following week, The Christmas Present became Williams' first number one album in Australia since Reality Killed the Video Star 10 years prior.

== Track listing ==
Disc one: Christmas Past
No.	Title	Writer(s)	Producers	Length
1.	"Winter Wonderland"	Felix Bernard; Richard B. Smith	Guy Chambers; Robbie Williams	2:18
2.	"Merry Xmas Everybody" (featuring Jamie Cullum)	Noddy Holder; Jim Lea	Chambers	3:33
3.	"Let It Snow! Let It Snow! Let It Snow!"	Jule Styne; Sammy Cahn	Chambers; Williams	1:57
4.	"The Christmas Song (Chestnuts Roasting on an Open Fire)"	Robert Wells; Mel Tormé	Chambers; Williams	3:12
5.	"Coco's Christmas Lullaby"	Robbie Williams; Kelvin Andrews; Richard Scott; Danny Spencer	Chambers; Williams	2:55
6.	"Rudolph"	Williams; Andrews; Scott; Spencer	Chambers; Williams	3:40
7.	"Yeah! It's Christmas"	Williams; Andrews; Scott; Scott Ralph	Chambers; Williams	2:49
8.	"It's a Wonderful Life" (featuring Poppa Pete)	Williams; Andrews; Scott; Spencer	Chambers; Williams	2:51
9.	"Let's Not Go Shopping"	Williams; Andrews; Scott; Spencer	Chambers; Williams	3:09
10.	"Santa Baby" (featuring Helene Fischer)	Joan Javits; Philip Springer; Tony Springer	Chambers; Williams	3:27
11.	"Best Christmas Ever"	Williams; Guy Chambers	Chambers; Williams	3:45
12.	"One Last Christmas"	Williams; Flynn Francis; Konrad Olsen	Chambers; Williams	3:33
13.	"Coco's Christmas Lullaby Reprise"	Williams; Andrews; Scott; Spencer		1:14

Disc two: Christmas Future
No.	Title	Writer(s)	Producers	Length
1.	"Time for Change"	Williams; Chambers; Karl Brazil; Tom Longworth	Chambers	3:30
2.	"Idlewild"	Williams; Brazil; Timothy Metcalfe	Chambers	4:08
3.	"Darkest Night"	Williams; Brazil; Owen Parker	Chambers; Williams	3:19
4.	"Fairytales" (featuring Rod Stewart)	Williams; Brazil; John Garrison; Martin Terefe	Chambers; Williams	3:33
5.	"Christmas (Baby Please Come Home)" (featuring Bryan Adams)	Jeff Barry; Ellie Greenwich; Phil Spector	Chambers; Williams	2:43
6.	"Bad Sharon" (featuring Tyson Fury)	Williams; Brazil; Benjamin Roy Castle	Chambers; Williams	3:40
7.	"Happy Birthday Jesus Christ"	Williams; Flynn Francis; Konrad Olsen; Philipp Steinke	Chambers; Williams	3:15
8.	"New Year's Day"	Williams; Brazil; Benjamin Roy Castle	Chambers; Williams	3:41
9.	"Snowflakes"	Williams; Francis; Olsen; Steinke	Chambers; Williams	3:41
10.	"Home"	Williams; Brazil; Parker; Sam Sure	Chambers; Williams	4:10
11.	"Soul Transmission"	Williams; Andrews; Spencer	Soul Mekanik & Daft Dog	4:14

Disc two: Christmas Future (2020 release)
No.	Title	Writer(s)	Producers	Length
1.	"Can't Stop Christmas"	Williams; Benjamin Roy Castle; Chris Heath	Chambers; Richard Flack	3:23
2.	"Time for Change"	Williams; Chambers; Karl Brazil; Tom Longworth	Chambers	3:30
3.	"Idlewild"	Williams; Brazil; Timothy Metcalfe	Chambers	4:08
4.	"Darkest Night"	Williams; Brazil; Owen Parker	Chambers; Williams	3:19
5.	"Fairytales" (featuring Rod Stewart)	Williams; Brazil; John Garrison; Martin Terefe	Chambers; Williams	3:33
6.	"Christmas (Baby Please Come Home)" (featuring Bryan Adams)	Jeff Barry; Ellie Greenwich; Phil Spector	Chambers; Williams	2:43
7.	"Bad Sharon" (featuring Tyson Fury)	Williams; Brazil; Benjamin Roy Castle	Chambers; Williams	3:40
8.	"Happy Birthday Jesus Christ"	Williams; Flynn Francis; Konrad Olsen; Philipp Steinke	Chambers; Williams	3:15
9.	"New Year's Day"	Williams; Brazil; Benjamin Roy Castle	Chambers; Williams	3:41
10.	"Snowflakes"	Williams; Francis; Olsen; Steinke	Chambers; Williams	3:41
11.	"Home"	Williams; Brazil; Parker; Sam Sure	Chambers; Williams	4:10
12.	"Soul Transmission"	Williams; Andrews; Spencer	Soul Mekanik & Daft Dog	4:14

Deluxe bonus tracks
No.	Title	Writer(s)	Length
13.	"I Believe in Father Christmas"	Greg Lake; Peter Sinfield	3:11
14.	"Not Christmas"	Williams; Francis; Metcalfe; Olsen	3:26
15.	"Merry Kissmas"	Williams; Brahim Fouradi; Edwin Serrano; Memru Renjaan; Carlos Vrolijk	2:43
16.	"It Takes Two" (featuring Rod Stewart)	William "Mickey" Stevenson; Sylvia Moy	3:53

== Charts ==
=== Weekly charts ===
Chart (2019)	Peak position
Australian Albums (ARIA)	1
Austrian Albums (Ö3 Austria)	1
Belgian Albums (Ultratop Flanders)	7
Belgian Albums (Ultratop Wallonia)	21
Czech Albums (ČNS IFPI)	7
Danish Albums (Hitlisten)	17
Dutch Albums (Album Top 100)	6
Finnish Albums (Suomen virallinen lista)	50
French Albums (SNEP)	53
German Albums (Offizielle Top 100)	1
Hungarian Albums (MAHASZ)	6
Irish Albums (IRMA)	7
Italian Albums (FIMI)	9
New Zealand Albums (RMNZ)	2
Polish Albums (ZPAV)	11
Portuguese Albums (AFP)	17
Scottish Albums (Official Charts)	2
Slovak Albums (ČNS IFPI)	9
Spanish Albums (Promusicae)	30
Swedish Albums (Sverigetopplistan)	31
Swiss Albums (Schweizer Hitparade)	1
Taiwanese Albums (Five Music)	11
UK Albums (Official Charts)	1

=== Year-end charts ===
Chart (2019)	Position
Australian Albums (ARIA)	45
Austrian Albums (Ö3 Austria)	5
Belgian Albums (Ultratop Flanders)	172
Dutch Albums (Album Top 100)	79
German Albums (Offizielle Top 100)	28
Swiss Albums (Schweizer Hitparade)	25
UK Albums (OCC)	12

Chart (2020)	Position
German Albums (Offizielle Top 100)	11
Swiss Albums (Schweizer Hitparade)	37

== Certifications ==
Region	Certification	Certified units/sales
Austria (IFPI Austria)	Platinum	15,000^{‡}
Germany (BVMI)	Gold	100,000^{‡}
Switzerland (IFPI Switzerland)	Gold	10,000^{‡}
United Kingdom (BPI)	Gold	100,000^{‡}
^{‡} Sales+streaming figures based on certification alone.
