= Time for Change (song) =

Single by Robbie Williams

from the album The Christmas Present
- Released: 22 November 2019
- Genre: Christmas; Pop
- Length: 3:30
- Label: Columbia
- Songwriters: Robert Williams; Guy Chambers; Karl Brazil; Tom Longworth
- Producer: Guy Chambers

Robbie Williams singles chronology
"Mixed Signals" (2017)	"Time for Change" (2019)	"Strange Days" (2020)

"Time for Change" is a song by British singer-songwriter Robbie Williams, released as the first single from his twelfth studio album The Christmas Present (2019). The single was released in the United Kingdom on 22 November 2019. The song was written by Williams, Guy Chambers, Karl Brazil and Tom Longworth. It was produced by Chambers.

An accompanying music video for "Time for Change", directed by Vaughan Arnell, was released on 22 November 2019. Williams performed "Time for Change" at his pair of concerts dubbed "The Robbie Williams Christmas Party" at the SSE Arena on 16 and 17 December 2019 in promotion of the album.

== Live performances ==
Williams performed "Time for Change" live for the first time on the Jonathan Ross Show on 23 November 2019. He also sang it on the TV special It's not the Robbie Williams Christmas Show on 8 December 2019.

== Critical reception ==
Jordan Bassett of NME praised the song and drew similarities to Williams' hit song "Strong", writing: "His longtime collaborator and co-producer Guy Chambers has brought a great deal of warmth to this collection – newbie ‘Time For A Change’ comes on like ‘Strong’ with bells and whistles on."

== Charts ==
Chart (2019)	Peak position
Belgium (Ultratop 50 Flanders)	33
Belgium (Ultratop 50 Wallonia)	34
Germany (GfK)	89
