= Swings Both Ways Live =

2014 concert tour by Robbie Williams

- Tour by Robbie Williams
- Promotional poster for the tour
- Location: Asia; Europe; Oceania
- Associated album: Swings Both Ways
- Start date: 25 April 2014
- End date: 28 September 2014
- Legs: 4
- No. of shows: 50

Robbie Williams concert chronology
- Take the Crown Stadium Tour (2013); Swings Both Ways Live (2014); Let Me Entertain You Tour (2015)

Swings Both Ways Live (also known as The Swing Tour Live) was the tenth concert tour by the English recording artist, Robbie Williams. The tour supports his tenth studio album, Swings Both Ways. Beginning April 2014, the tour played 50 shows in Europe, Oceania and Asia.

== Set list ==
The following set list is obtained from the concert of 25 April 2014 at the Budapest Sports Arena in Budapest, Hungary. It does not represents all concerts during the tour.

1. "Shine My Shoes"
2. "Puttin' On the Ritz"
3. "Ain't That a Kick in the Head?"
4. "Minnie the Moocher"
5. "Swing Supreme"
6. "No One Likes a Fat Pop Star"
7. "That's Amore"
8. "Mr. Bojangles"
9. "I Wan'na Be Like You"
10. "High Hopes"
11. "Swings Both Ways"
12. "Soda Pop"
13. "Fever"
14. "If I Only Had a Brain"
15. "Go Gentle"
16. "Do Nothing till You Hear from Me"
17. "Theme from New York"
18. "Angels"
19. "Sensational"

Notes

- "I Will Talk and Hollywood Will Listen" was performed in lieu of "If I Only Had a Brain" for shows in Northern Ireland, the United Kingdom, Australia and Berlin (Germany)

== Tour dates ==
List of 2014 concerts
| Date | City | Country | Venue |
|---|---|---|---|
| 25 April 2014 | Budapest | Hungary | Budapest Sports Arena |
| 26 April 2014 | Prague | Czech Republic | O_{2} Arena |
| 28 April 2014 | Vienna | Austria | Wiener Stadthalle |
| 29 April 2014 | Vienna | Austria | Wiener Stadthalle |
| 1 May 2014 | Turin | Italy | Torino Palasport Olimpico |
| 3 May 2014^{[A]} | Ischgl | Austria | Silvrettaseilbahn AG |
| 4 May 2014 | Amsterdam | Netherlands | Ziggo Dome |
| 5 May 2014 | Amsterdam | Netherlands | Ziggo Dome |
| 7 May 2014 | Düsseldorf | Germany | ISS Dome |
| 8 May 2014 | Düsseldorf | Germany | ISS Dome |
| 10 May 2014 | Herning | Denmark | Jyske Bank Boxen |
| 11 May 2014 | Herning | Denmark | Jyske Bank Boxen |
| 13 May 2014 | Fornebu | Norway | Telenor Arena |
| 15 May 2014 | Stockholm | Sweden | Ericsson Globe |
| 18 May 2014 | Helsinki | Finland | Hartwall Areena |
| 19 May 2014 | Helsinki | Finland | Hartwall Areena |
| 21 May 2014 | Hamburg | Germany | O_{2} World Hamburg |
| 22 May 2014 | Hamburg | Germany | O_{2} World Hamburg |
| 25 May 2014^{[B]} | Lisbon | Portugal | Parque da Bela Vista |
| 28 May 2014 | Berlin | Germany | O_{2} World |
| 29 May 2014 | Berlin | Germany | O_{2} World |
| 31 May 2014 | Monte Carlo | Monaco | Salle des Étoiles |
| 2 June 2014 | Zürich | Switzerland | Hallenstadion |
| 3 June 2014 | Zürich | Switzerland | Hallenstadion |
| 13 June 2014 | Belfast | Northern Ireland | Odyssey Arena |
| 14 June 2014 | Belfast | Northern Ireland | Odyssey Arena |
| 16 June 2014 | Leeds | England | First Direct Arena |
| 17 June 2014 | Leeds | England | First Direct Arena |
| 22 June 2014 | Newcastle | England | Metro Radio Arena |
| 23 June 2014 | Newcastle | England | Metro Radio Arena |
| 26 June 2014 | Glasgow | Scotland | SSE Hydro |
| 27 June 2014 | Glasgow | Scotland | SSE Hydro |
| 29 June 2014 | Manchester | England | Phones 4u Arena |
| 30 June 2014 | Manchester | England | Phones 4u Arena |
| 2 July 2014 | Manchester | England | Phones 4u Arena |
| 5 July 2014 | Birmingham | England | LG Arena |
| 6 July 2014 | Birmingham | England | LG Arena |
| 8 July 2014 | London | England | The O_{2} Arena |
| 9 July 2014 | London | England | The O_{2} Arena |
| 11 July 2014 | London | England | The O_{2} Arena |
| 12 July 2014 | London | England | The O_{2} Arena |
| 11 September 2014 | Perth | Australia | Perth Arena |
| 12 September 2014 | Perth | Australia | Perth Arena |
| 16 September 2014 | Melbourne | Australia | Rod Laver Arena |
| 17 September 2014 | Melbourne | Australia | Rod Laver Arena |
| 20 September 2014^{[C]} | Singapore | | Marina Bay Street Circuit |
| 22 September 2014 | Brisbane | Australia | Brisbane Entertainment Centre |
| 23 September 2014 | Brisbane | Australia | Brisbane Entertainment Centre |
| 27 September 2014 | Sydney | Australia | Allphones Arena |
| 28 September 2014 | Sydney | Australia | Allphones Arena |

Festivals and other miscellaneous performances
^{A} Top of the Mountain Concert
^{B} Rock in Rio Lisboa
^{C} 2014 Formula 1 Singapore Airlines Singapore Grand Prix

=== Box office score data ===
| Venue | City | Tickets sold / Available | Gross revenue |
|---|---|---|---|
| O_{2} World Hamburg | Hamburg | 24,307 / 25,292 (96%) | $2,399,880 |
| O_{2} World | Berlin | 26,474 / 27,418 (97%) | $2,709,230 |
| Hallenstadion | Zürich | 26,000 / 26,000 (100%) | $3,236,680 |
| Phones 4u Arena | Manchester | 8,582 / 9,428 (91%) | $1,108,450 |
| The O2 Arena | London | 62,040 / 66,256 (94%) | $8,492,880 |
| Perth Arena | Perth | 24,202 / 25,334 (96%) | $3,472,580 |
| Rod Laver Arena | Melbourne | 22,790 / 22,790 (100%) | $3,316,660 |
| Brisbane Entertainment Centre | Brisbane | 17,752 / 21,304 (83%) | $2,575,460 |
| Allphones Arena | Sydney | 26,398 / 26,398 (100%) | $3,667,500 |
| TOTAL | | 238,545 / 250,220 (95%) | $30,979,320 |
