= Take the Crown (disambiguation) =

Take the Crown is an album by Robbie Williams.

Take the Crown may also refer to:

- Take the Crown Stadium Tour, a concert tour in support of the album
- Take the Crown (band), American band active 2004–2008
- Conspiracy: Take the Crown, expansion in the trading card game Magic: The Gathering
