= Take the Crown Stadium Tour =

2013 concert tour by Robbie Williams

- Tour by Robbie Williams
- Promotional poster for the tour
- Location: Europe
- Associated album: Take the Crown
- Start date: 14 June 2013
- End date: 25 August 2013
- No. of shows: 26
- Supporting act: Olly Murs

Robbie Williams concert chronology
- Close Encounters Tour (2006); Take the Crown Stadium Tour (2013); Swings Both Ways Live (2014)

The Take the Crown Stadium Tour was a concert tour by the English singer-songwriter Robbie Williams in promotion of his ninth studio album Take the Crown The tour was his first solo tour since the Close Encounters Tour (2006). In July 2013, the tour ranked 35th on Pollstar's annual "Top 100 Mid Year Worldwide Tours". It earned $20 million from nine shows.

== Opening acts ==
- Olly Murs

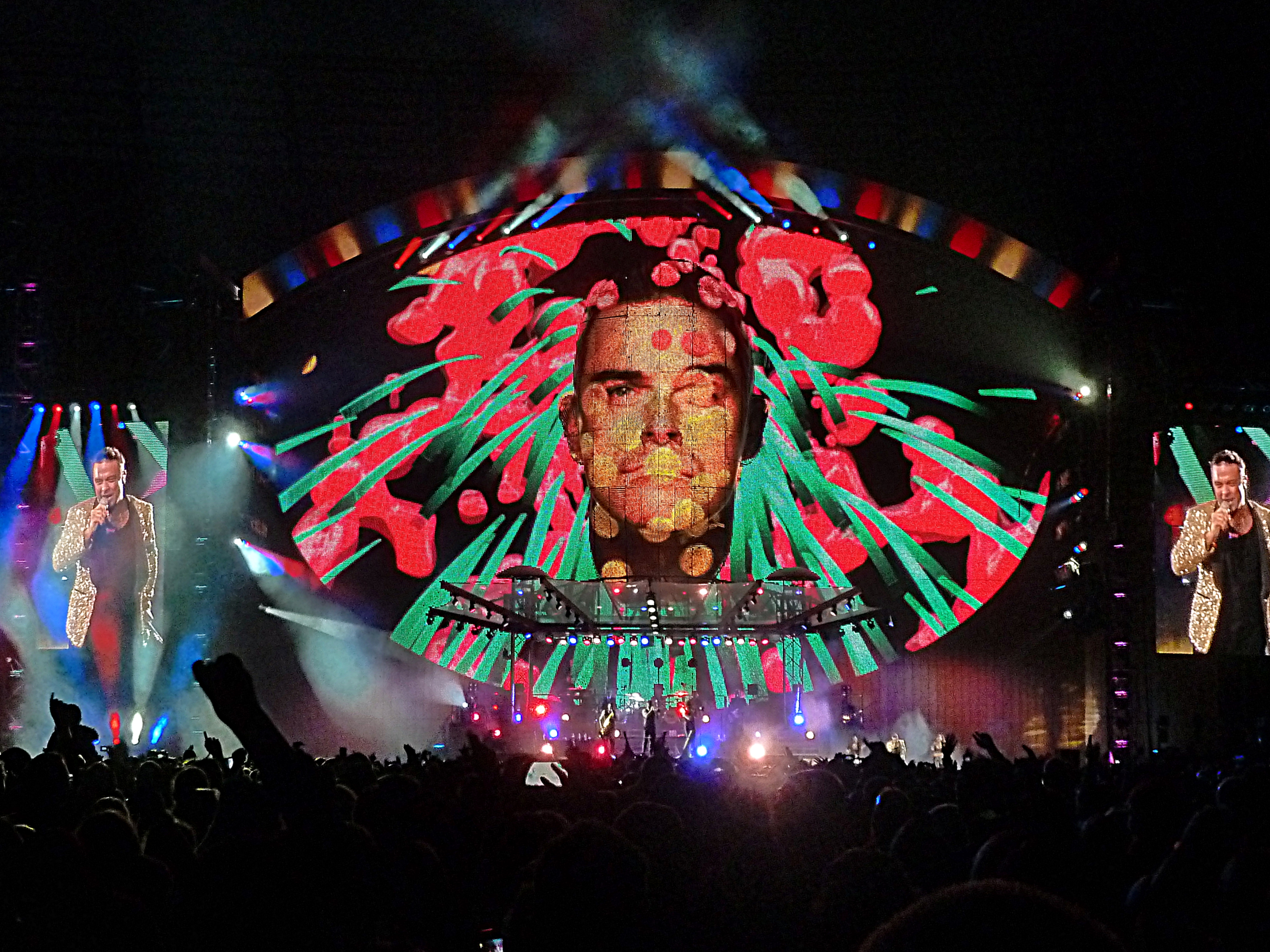
Williams at the Etihad Stadium, June 2013

== Setlist ==
1. "Hey Wow Yeah Yeah"
2. "Let Me Entertain You" (contains elements of "I Want to Take You Higher")
3. "Monsoon"
4. "Not Like The Others"
5. "Minnie The Moocher"
6. "Kids" (performed with Olly Murs)
7. "Sin Sin Sin"
8. "Bodies"
9. "Come Undone" (contains elements of "Walk on the Wild Side" and "Never Forget")
10. "Everything Changes"
11. "Strong"
12. "Gospel"
13. "Be a Boy" (contains elements of "Use Somebody")
14. "Millennium"
15. "Better Man"
16. "Sexed Up"
17. "Me and My Monkey"
18. "Candy" (contains elements of "Billie Jean" and "Blitzkrieg Bop" )
19. "Hot Fudge" (contains elements of "Listen to the Music") / "Rudebox" (contains elements of "Vogue")
20. "Rock DJ"

Encore

21. "Feel"
22. "She's the One"
23. "Angels"

== Tour dates ==
List of 2013 concerts
Date	City	Country	Venue
14 June 2013	Dublin	Ireland	Aviva Stadium
18 June 2013	Manchester	England	Etihad Stadium
19 June 2013	Manchester	England	Etihad Stadium
21 June 2013	Manchester	England	Etihad Stadium
22 June 2013	Manchester	England	Etihad Stadium
25 June 2013	Glasgow	Scotland	Hampden Park
26 June 2013	Glasgow	Scotland	Hampden Park
29 June 2013	London	England	Wembley Stadium
30 June 2013	London	England	Wembley Stadium
2 July 2013	London	England	Wembley Stadium
5 July 2013	London	England	Wembley Stadium
10 July 2013	Gelsenkirchen	Germany	Veltins-Arena
13 July 2013	Amsterdam	Netherlands	Amsterdam Arena
17 July 2013	Vienna	Austria	Trabrennbahn Krieau
20 July 2013	Gothenburg	Sweden	Ullevi
22 July 2013	Copenhagen	Denmark	Parken Stadium
23 July 2013	Copenhagen	Denmark	Parken Stadium
27 July 2013	Hanover	Germany	AWD-Arena
31 July 2013	Milan	Italy	San Siro
3 August 2013	Brussels	Belgium	Stade Roi Baudouin
7 August 2013	Munich	Germany	Olympic Stadium
11 August 2013	Stuttgart	Germany	Mercedes-Benz Arena
13 August 2013	Zagreb	Croatia	Stadion Maksimir
16 August 2013	Zurich	Switzerland	Letzigrund
20 August 2013	Tallinn	Estonia	Tallinn Song Festival Grounds
25 August 2013	Stavanger	Norway	Viking Stadion

== DVD release ==
In July 2013, it was revealed the concert at the Tallinn Song Festival Grounds in Tallinn, Estonia will be live-streamed in numerous cinemas in Europe. Believed to be called "The Experience: Live from Tallinn", a trailer for the event was released on Williams' YouTube channel. Footage for the trailer was obtained from his shows at Wembley Stadium. Also featured on the channel are behind the scenes vignettes for each concert location. On 5 December 2014 the concert recorded in Estonia was released on commercial video release in both Blu-ray and DVD formats, Robbie Williams – Live in Tallinn.

== Notes ==
1. Data from study is collected from all worldwide concerts held between 1 January – 30 June 2012. All monetary figures are based in US dollars. All information is based upon extensive research conducted by Pollstar.
