= Shine My Shoes =

Single by Robbie Williams

from the album Swings Both Ways
- Released: 24 March 2014
- Genre: Pop; swing
- Length: 3:23
- Label: Island; Universal
- Songwriters: Robbie Williams; Guy Chambers; Chris Heath
- Producer: Guy Chambers

Robbie Williams singles chronology
"Dream a Little Dream" (2013)	"Shine My Shoes" (2014)	"The Days" (2014)

Music video
- "Shine My Shoes" on YouTube

"Shine My Shoes" is a song by British singer-songwriter Robbie Williams and the third and final single from his tenth studio album Swings Both Ways (2013). The single was released on 24 March 2014. The song was written by Robbie Williams, Guy Chambers and Chris Heath. A vinyl version of the single was released two months prior to the official single release, through robbiewilliams.com.

== Background ==
According to Robbie;

"Guy Chambers and I started writing together again after a break of about ten years, and 'Shine My Shoes' came out of the first batch. It's in the spirit of a Sammy Davis Jr. song. In the biopic The Rat Pack there's a dream sequence where Sammy Davis Jr. is dancing against the racists. I'm singing against the haters and the naysayers, giving them my time in the form of a swing song detailing exactly why they should hate me. The smugness will infuriate the haters, and the people who kind of like me will just think that it's sweet."

The song also contains "lyrical flourishes from Williams's biographer Chris Heath" and Williams dismissing his critics ("The way you don't love me/Kinda makes you look ugly").

== Music video ==
An official lyric video of "Shine My Shoes" was uploaded to YouTube on 26 September 2013.

== Critical reception ==
Helen Brown of The Telegraph, in a review for Swings Both Ways, called it "an original, though instantly recognisable and fairly forgettable Williams/Chambers collaboration".

== Track listing ==
Vinyl single (January 2014)
No.	Title	Length
1.	"Shine My Shoes"	3:21
2.	"You Got Old" (featuring Jonny Wilkes)	3:45

== Chart performance ==
Chart (2014)	Peak position
UK Singles (OCC)	89
