= Be a Boy =

Single by Robbie Williams

from the album Take the Crown
- Released: 11 March 2013
- Recorded: 2011–12
- Genre: Pop
- Length: 4:39 (album version); 3:42 (radio edit)
- Label: Island; Universal
- Songwriters: Robbie Williams; Tim Metcalfe; Flynn Francis
- Producer: Jacknife Lee

Robbie Williams singles chronology
"Different" (2012)	"Be a Boy" (2013)	"Goin' Crazy" (2013)

Music video
- "Be a Boy" on YouTube

"Be a Boy" is a song by English singer-songwriter Robbie Williams, taken from his ninth studio album, Take the Crown. It was released as the album's third and final single on 11 March 2013. The song was written by Robbie Williams, Tim Metcalfe and Flynn Francis. The song charted in Belgium. It was inspired by the fact people told Robbie his career was over, which is reference in the lines "They said it was leaving me, the magic was leaving me" and "I can make this last forever"

== Music video ==
A music video to accompany the release of "Be a Boy" was first released onto YouTube on 29 January 2013 at a total length of three minutes and fifty-two seconds.

== Track listing ==
Digital download
No.	Title	Length
1.	"Be a Boy"	4:39

== Chart performance ==
Chart (2013)	Peak position
Albania (NRG Top 50 Chart)	33
Belgium (Ultratip Bubbling Under Flanders)	14
Belgium (Ultratip Bubbling Under Wallonia)	11
Netherlands (Dutch Top 40)	52
Slovakia Airplay (ČNS IFPI)	95
UK Airplay (Music Week)	17

== Release history ==
Country	Date	Format	Label
United Kingdom	11 March 2013	Digital download	Universal
