= Different (Robbie Williams song) =

Single by Robbie Williams

from the album Take the Crown
- Released: 17 December 2012
- Recorded: 2011–2012
- Genre: Pop rock; baroque pop
- Length: 4:52 (Album version); 4:11 (Radio edit); 5:07 (Music video)
- Label: Island; Universal
- Songwriter(s): Robbie Williams; Gary Barlow; Jacknife Lee
- Producer(s): Jacknife Lee

Robbie Williams singles chronology
"Candy" (2012)	"Different" (2012)	"Be a Boy" (2013)

Music video
- "Different" on YouTube

"Different" is a song by English singer-songwriter Robbie Williams, taken from his ninth studio album, Take the Crown. It was released as the album's second single on 17 December 2012. The song was written by Williams, Gary Barlow and Jacknife Lee. The single was accompanied by four extra tracks: "On My Own", a duet with Tom Jones, "Soul Transmission", "White Man in Hanoi", a cut from Take the Crown, and "The Promise", a cover from singer songwriter Paul Freeman (Robbie's Christmas song).

== Background ==
"Different" was produced by Jacknife Lee, who said of the track: "I think when Robbie gets a song right, it's the vulnerability mixed with the bravado that makes it so compelling", to which Robbie replied, "It's the great hope of the second single variety. A lot of effort went into this song, which is a very personal statement". Williams also commented on the number of B-sides released with the single: "I write so many songs and I love all of them, but they don't all make it onto a record. Some of my favourite songs have never been heard. I wanted to put out an EP so a few more could be heard. Check out the legend that is Tom Jones on 'On My Own'. 'The Promise' is my Christmas song." Digital versions of the single available in Germany contain a bonus live recording of "Different", featuring vocals from co-songwriter Gary Barlow, who performed the track live with Williams on 23 November 2012, at the O2 Arena in London.

== Music video ==
The music video for the track premiered on 27 November 2012, via Williams' official VEVO account on YouTube, at a total length of five minutes and seven seconds. Directed by W.I.Z., the video features Williams dressed as an orchestra conductor, who is conducting an orchestra playing music for a film that also features Williams as the lead role, a gangster character struggling to prevent his strained relationship with wife boiling over and affecting his job. He is seen arguing with his wife, wasting a pint of milk she had especially bought for him. Williams said of the video: "It was a real fun one to film. It took around three days to film each of the separate sequences, but the supporting cast were exceptionally great. I would love to make videos like this all the time."

== Track listing ==
No.	Title	Writer(s)	Producer(s)	Length
1.	"Different"	Williams, Gary Barlow, Jacknife Lee	Jacknife Lee	4:52
2.	"On My Own (Demo)" (featuring Tom Jones)	Williams, Kelvin Andrews, Danny Spencer	Soul Mekanik & Daft Dog	3:21
3.	"Soul Transmission (Demo)"	Williams, Andrews, Spencer	Soul Mekanik & daft Dog	4:26
4.	"White Man in Hanoi (Demo)"	Williams, Tim Metcalfe, Flynn Francis	Tim Metcalfe/Flynn Francis	3:51
5.	"The Promise (Demo)"	Williams, Paul Freeman	Jacknife Lee	3:49

German digital download bonus track
No.	Title	Writer(s)	Producer(s)	Length
6.	"Different" (Live featuring Gary Barlow)	Williams, Gary Barlow, Jacknife Lee	Jacknife Lee	4:32

== Charts ==
Chart (2012)	Peak position
Austria (Ö3 Austria Top 40)	37
Belgium (Ultratip Bubbling Under Flanders)	12
Belgium (Ultratip Bubbling Under Wallonia)	8
Germany (GfK)	31
South Korea (Gaon Single Chart)	65
UK Singles (Official Charts Company)	64
UK Airplay (Music Week)	12

== Release history ==
Country	Date	Format
Germany	14 December 2012	CD single
United Kingdom	17 December 2012	Digital download
