= Go Gentle =

Single by Robbie Williams

from the album Swings Both Ways
- Released: 10 November 2013
- Genre: Pop; swing
- Length: 4:31
- Label: Island; Universal
- Songwriters: Robbie Williams; Guy Chambers; Chris Heath
- Producer: Guy Chambers

Robbie Williams singles chronology
"Goin' Crazy" (2013)	"Go Gentle" (2013)	"Dream a Little Dream" (2013)

Music video
- "Go Gentle" on YouTube

"Go Gentle" is a song by British singer-songwriter Robbie Williams, released as the lead single from his tenth studio album Swings Both Ways (2013). The single was released in the United Kingdom on 10 November 2013. The song was written by Robbie Williams, Guy Chambers and Chris Heath.

== Background ==
In an interview with Magic FM, Williams said that the song is a promise to his daughter Teddy. He said: "Go Gentle is a promise I'm making to my daughter. It was written when she first arrived on the planet and I'd been a selfish popstar for most of my life and then all of a sudden I've been asked to take care of this whole person. I still am scared that I'm not up to the task! I'm doing a good job of being a dad but it's scary, you have to look after this person for the whole of their life, I'm not very good at even looking after me!"

== Music video ==
A music video to accompany the release of "Go Gentle" was first released onto YouTube on 16 October 2013 at a total length of three minutes and fifty seconds. The video shows Williams dressed as a sea captain and performing the song on a parade float decorated as a wooden ship, backed by a band dressed as sailors, moving through the streets of downtown Los Angeles.

== Critical reception ==
Lewis Corner of Digital Spy gave the song a positive review, stating:

"The singer's showmanship makes him a natural when it comes to the bravado and assurance of swing music [...] But with a classic whistle line, a smooth melody and Robbie's undiminished star quality, we're pretty certain 'Go Gentle' will stand the test of time to serve its true purpose."

== Live performances ==
On 10 November 2013, Williams performed "Go Gentle" on the live results show of The X Factor.

== Track listing ==
Digital download
No.	Title	Length
1.	"Go Gentle"	4:31

CD single
No.	Title	Length
1.	"Go Gentle"	4:31
2.	"You Got Old" (featuring Jonathan Wilkes)	3:45

== Charts ==
=== Weekly charts ===
Weekly chart performance for "Go Gentle"
Chart (2013)	Peak position
Austria (Ö3 Austria Top 40)	29
Belgium (Ultratip Bubbling Under Flanders)	18
Belgium (Ultratip Bubbling Under Wallonia)	24
Euro Digital Song Sales (Billboard)	13
Germany (GfK)	16
Hungary (Rádiós Top 40)	7
Hungary (Single Top 40)	19
Ireland (IRMA)	28
Italy (FIMI)	5
Italy (Musica e dischi)	14
Lebanon (The Official Lebanese Top 20)	5
Mexico Inglés (Billboard)	38
Netherlands (Dutch Top 40)	45
Netherlands (Single Top 100)	78
Scottish Singles Sales (Official Charts)	11
Slovenia (SloTop50)	12
Switzerland (Schweizer Hitparade)	22
UK Singles (Official Charts)	10
UK Airplay (Music Week)	6

=== Year-end charts ===
Annual chart rankings for "Go Gentle"
Chart (2013)	Position
Hungarian Airplay Chart	98
Italy (Musica e dischi)	83

== Certifications ==
Certifications for "Go Gentle"
Region	Certification	Certified units/sales
Italy (FIMI)	Gold	15,000^{‡}
United Kingdom (BPI)	Silver	200,000^{‡}
^{‡} Sales+streaming figures based on certification alone.

== Release history ==
Country	Release date	Format	Label
United Kingdom	10 November 2013	Digital download	Island, Universal
