= Take the Crown =

Studio album by Robbie Williams
- Released: 5 November 2012
- Recorded: September 2011 – August 2012
- Studios: The Garage (Topanga, California); Capitol (Hollywood); Ocean (Burbank, California)
- Genre: Pop rock
- Length: 43:45 (standard edition); 52:22 (deluxe edition bonus tracks)
- Labels: Island; Universal
- Producer: Jacknife Lee

Robbie Williams chronology
In and Out of Consciousness: Greatest Hits 1990–2010 (2010)	Take the Crown (2012)	Robbie Williams: Live at the O2 (2012)

Singles from Take the Crown
- 1. "Candy" Released: 11 September 2012; 2. "Different" Released: 17 December 2012; 3. "Be a Boy" Released: 11 March 2013

Take the Crown is the ninth studio album released by English singer-songwriter Robbie Williams. The album was released in the United Kingdom on 5 November 2012 via Island Records.

Take the Crown is preceded by the lead single, "Candy", a track Williams co-wrote with Gary Barlow which became his seventh solo number one single in the UK and 14th career UK number one. The album also featured the original demo version of Take That's "Eight Letters", which is entirely performed by Williams. It is his first solo album in three years after his return to Take That in 2010.

According to the International Federation of the Phonographic Industry (IFPI), Take the Crown was the 36th global best-selling album of 2012, with sales of 1.2 million copies. At the 2013 Brit Awards, "Candy" was nominated for British Single of the Year but lost to Adele's "Skyfall".

To promote the album, Williams started the Take the Crown Stadium Tour, which lasted from June to August 2013.

== Background ==
Speaking of the album, Williams has claimed: "After the Take That reunion – a busman's holiday, a break from my career which re-energised me in many, many ways – I wanted to come back with a massive solo album. My main priority was to write what I consider, and hopefully what the world would consider, to be hits. I'm very excited".

The album was made available to pre-order from midnight on 3 September 2012. Music industry magazine Music Week was given the chance to listen to the record in advance and gave the following review: "Take The Crown is the big, brash, confident Robbie Williams pop record that his fans have been longing for but maybe didn't dare expect. If it had a sub-title it would be 'In Case You'd Forgotten'. Not wishing to denigrate the art of the record executive, but Island may as well have chosen the lead single by chucking a dart at the inlay sleeve. They couldn't have missed. Because there are no misses. Just hits – huge pop hits."

The album's lead single, the Williams/Gary Barlow-penned "Candy", was released on 29 October 2012. The track was originally rumoured to be titled "Vertigo". Williams said of the track: "It's a summer song, very much in a similar vein to 'Rock DJ', about a girl who thinks she's great. And she might be, but she's a bit nefarious with her ways. Some songs take an age to write and some songs just fall out of your mouth completely formed, and you don't have to think about it. I don't know why that fell out of my mouth and out of my brain at that particular time – it just did." Williams has stated that he did not tour his last album as he wasn't "into it that much". Williams said "I want to impress on people that I'm fully in with this one. I want to dominate the charts. I want to take on the world. I want to be a top pop star. I'm re-energised and it's called Take the Crown for that reason."

== Singles ==
The album's lead single, "Candy", premiered on 10 September 2012 and was released on 11 September in most countries and 29 October in the UK. In the UK, "Candy" became Williams' first number one single since "Radio" (2004) and his seventh solo number one single. In its first week the song had sold 137,000 copies becoming the fastest-selling male artist single of the year.

"Different" was released on 17 December and peaked at 64 on the UK Singles Chart.

"Be a Boy" was released on 11 March 2013 as a digital download.

== Critical reception ==
Professional ratings
Aggregate scores
Source	Rating
Metacritic	65/100
Review scores
Source	Rating
AllMusic	3/5 stars
The Daily Telegraph	3/5 stars
The Guardian	4/5 stars
The Independent	3/5 stars
Mojo	3/5 stars
MusicOMH	2.5/5 stars
The Observer	2/5 stars
PopMatters	7/10
Slant Magazine	2.5/5 stars
Uncut	3.5/5 stars

Upon its release, Take the Crown received generally positive response from most music critics, based on an aggregate score of 65/100 from Metacritic that indicates "generally favourable reviews". Tom Hocknell from BBC Music gave Take the Crown a favourable review. He said that "The presence of producer Jacknife Lee demonstrates that Robbie's search to replace Guy Chambers and Steve Power has grown less urgent and more interesting". Hocknell felt that the album comes to life "with 'All That I Want' and the hypnotic 'Hunting for You', while 'Into the Silence' is evocative of The Joshua Tree-period U2". He also felt that Take the Crown finds Williams "sounding rather too serious, rather too often. It's safe, something of a retreat from past endeavours to a sound more suited to commercial returns in the present". Andy Gill from The Independent gave the album three stars (out of five). He said that the album was "crafted with great skill, Williams and producer Jacknife Lee turning their hands to a range of styles". Gill mentioned influences such as U2 (on "Into the Silence" and "Hunting for You") and Plastic Bertrand (on "Hey Wow Yeah Yeah") as well as The Bee Gees in terms of songwriting.

Alexis Petridis from The Guardian gave the album four stars (out of five). Petridis said that "You end up with an album that, had it been released as the followup to 2005's Intensive Care, would almost certainly have been the vast success that Williams wants it to be now. It's not going to win over anyone who doesn't already own at least a couple of Robbie Williams albums, but that isn't what it sets out to do". Neil McCormick from The Daily Telegraph gave Take the Crown three stars (out of five). He said that the album is "chock-full of anthemic, highly charged pop-rock songs but the stadium-scale synth and guitar blend is a long way from cutting-edge contemporary chart music, while a recurring lyrical theme is regret for past behaviour". McCormick felt that the album is "more epic rock than playground pop" while stating that "The moment when Williams had his finger on the pulse of the pop nation is gone, leaving only a smart, accomplished entertainer singing to his fan base".

== Commercial performance ==
In the United Kingdom, Take the Crown debuted at number one on the UK Albums Chart, making it Williams' tenth number one album. It also marked the second time that Williams had a number one single ("Candy") and album at the same time on the chart. The first time was in 2001 when "Somethin' Stupid" and Swing When You're Winning were number one on the singles and albums charts respectively. In the UK, Take the Crown sold a total of 445,500 copies during 2012. As of December 2013, the album had sold 515,207 copies in the UK.

== Take the Crown: Live at the O2 ==
In November 2012, Robbie Williams performed three concerts at The O2 Arena in London as part of a promotional tour of the album. The concerts were all recorded and released as "instant" limited edition live albums. The final night of the shows was broadcast live on the internet as well as on Sky1 and directed by Hamish Hamilton. The Guardian gave the show four stars (out of five) while calling it "entertaining". It was noted that "there's not much of the big visual gimmickry that tends to mark out pop shows: it relies on Williams's personality and arsenal of hits to carry it, which they do." Emily Jupp from The Independent has also given the shows four stars (out of five). She said that the show had "Spontaneous bursts of tap dancing, crotch-thrusting, bum-shaking, jokes about the Queen, carry-on style gags about sleeping with 'girls on the game', could form an entire show by themselves without any singing needed." Jupp also said that Williams is "a true entertainer, he treads a fine line between cheeky and offensive, like a racier version of Bruce Forsyth." The shows also featured special appearances from Take That bandmate Gary Barlow and music producer Guy Chambers with whom Williams has not worked with since 2002.

=== Set list ===
1. "Hey Wow Yeah Yeah"
2. "Let Me Entertain You"
3. "Lazy Days"
4. "2001/Karma Killer"
5. "Candy"
6. "Rock DJ"
7. "Gospel"
8. "Monsoon"
9. "Eternity" (with Guy Chambers)
10. "Mr Bojangles" (with Guy Chambers)
11. "She's the One" (with Guy Chambers)
12. "Be a Boy"
13. "Come Undone"
14. "Bodies"
15. "Feel"
16. "Not Like the Others"
17. "Millennium"
18. "Hot Fudge"
19. "Kids"

Encore

20. "Strong"
21. "Eight Letters" (with Gary Barlow)
22. "Different" (with Gary Barlow)
23. "Angels"
24. "Losers"

=== Box office score data ===
Venue	City	Tickets sold / available	Gross revenue
The O2 Arena	London	54,305 / 56,325 (96%)	$7,900,231

== Track listing ==
All production done by Jacknife Lee.

Take the Crown – Standard edition
No.	Title	Writer(s)	Length
1.	"Be a Boy"	Robbie Williams; Tim Metcalfe; Flynn Francis	4:39
2.	"Gospel"	Williams; Metcalfe; Francis; Jacknife Lee	4:26
3.	"Candy"	Williams; Gary Barlow; Terje Olsen	3:21
4.	"Different"	Williams; Barlow; Lee	4:52
5.	"Shit on the Radio"	Williams; Metcalfe; Francis; Lee	2:53
6.	"All That I Want"	Williams; Metcalfe; Francis	3:30
7.	"Hunting for You"	Williams; Metcalfe; Francis; Lee	3:58
8.	"Into the Silence"	Williams; Metcalfe; Francis	4:48
9.	"Hey Wow Yeah Yeah"	Williams; Boots Ottestad	2:52
10.	"Not Like the Others"	Williams; Metcalfe; Francis	4:15
11.	"Losers" (featuring Lissie)	Barbara Gruska; Ethan Gruska	4:08

Deluxe edition bonus tracks
No.	Title	Writer(s)	Length
12.	"Reverse"	Williams; Metcalfe; Francis	3:56
13.	"Eight Letters"	Barlow; Howard Donald; Jason Orange; Mark Owen; Williams	4:40

Deluxe edition bonus DVD
No.	Title	Length
1.	"Not Like the Others" (Making of the Album)	4:30
2.	"Candy: Day 1" (Making of the Video)	3:52
3.	"Candy: Day 2" (Making of the Video)	4:29

== Charts ==
=== Weekly charts ===
Chart (2012–2013)	Peak position
Australian Albums (ARIA)	4
Austrian Albums (Ö3 Austria)	1
Belgian Albums (Ultratop Flanders)	8
Belgian Albums (Ultratop Wallonia)	9
Croatian Albums (HDU)	1
Czech Albums (IFPI)	6
Danish Albums (Hitlisten)	3
Dutch Albums (Album Top 100)	1
Finnish Albums (Suomen virallinen lista)	13
French Albums (SNEP)	9
German Albums (Offizielle Top 100)	1
Greek Albums (IFPI)	1
Hungarian Albums (MAHASZ)	16
Icelandic Albums (Tónlist)	18
Irish Albums (IRMA)	1
Italian Albums (FIMI)	2
Italian Albums (Musica e dischi)	2
Mexican Albums (Top 100 Mexico)	16
New Zealand Albums (RMNZ)	12
Norwegian Albums (VG-lista)	5
Polish Albums (ZPAV)	42
Portuguese Albums (AFP)	12
Scottish Albums (Official Charts)	1
South Korean Albums (Gaon Chart)	9
Spanish Albums (Promusicae)	9
Swedish Albums (Sverigetopplistan)	7
Swiss Albums (Schweizer Hitparade)	1
Taiwanese Albums (Five Music)	6
UK Albums (Official Charts)	1

=== Year-end charts ===
Chart (2012)	Position
Austrian Albums (Ö3 Austria)	30
Belgian Albums (Ultratop Wallonia)	76
Dutch Albums (Album Top 100)	16
German Albums (Offizielle Top 100)	16
Hungarian Albums (MAHASZ)	65
Italian Albums (FIMI)	39
Swedish Albums (Sverigetopplistan)	73
Swiss Albums (Schweizer Hitparade)	47
UK Albums (OCC)	13
Chart (2013)	Position
Austrian Albums (Ö3 Austria)	48
Swiss Albums (Schweizer Hitparade)	86
UK Albums (OCC)	131

== Certifications ==
Region	Certification	Certified units/sales
Australia (ARIA)	Gold	35,000^{^}
Austria (IFPI Austria)	Platinum	20,000^{*}
Denmark (IFPI Danmark)	Gold	10,000^{^}
Germany (BVMI)	Platinum	200,000^{^}
Hungary (MAHASZ)	Gold	3,000^{^}
Ireland (IRMA)	Gold	7,500^{^}
Italy (FIMI)	Gold	30,000^{*}
Netherlands (NVPI)	Platinum	50,000^{^}
Switzerland (IFPI Switzerland)	Gold	15,000^{^}
United Kingdom (BPI)	Platinum	519,585
Summaries
Worldwide	—	1,200,000
^{*} Sales figures based on certification alone.^{^} Shipments figures based on certification alone.

== Release history ==
Region	Date	Label	Format
Ireland	2 November 2012	Universal Music	CD, digital download (standard and deluxe edition)
Australia	2 November 2012	Universal Music	CD, digital download (standard and deluxe edition)
Sweden	2 November 2012	Universal Music	CD, digital download (standard and deluxe edition)
Germany	2 November 2012	Island	CD, digital download (standard and deluxe edition)
United Kingdom	5 November 2012	Island	CD, digital download (standard and deluxe edition)
Mexico	6 November 2012	Universal Music	CD, digital download (standard and deluxe edition)
Italy	6 November 2012	Universal Music	CD, digital download (standard and deluxe edition)
