= Swings Both Ways =

Studio album by Robbie Williams
- Released: 15 November 2013
- Recorded: January – May 2013
- Studios: Angel, London
- Genres: Swing; pop
- Length: 45:04 (standard edition); 56:24 (deluxe edition)
- Labels: Island; Universal
- Producer: Guy Chambers

Robbie Williams chronology
Robbie Williams: Live at the O2 (2012)	Swings Both Ways (2013)	Under the Radar Volume 1 (2014)

Singles from Swings Both Ways
- 1. "Go Gentle" Released: 10 November 2013; 2. "Dream a Little Dream" Released: 15 December 2013; 3. "Shine My Shoes" Released: 24 March 2014

Swings Both Ways is the tenth studio album by English singer-songwriter Robbie Williams. It is his second swing album after 2001's Swing When You're Winning; unlike the latter, which had one original composition, this album features an equal mix of both covers and original material. The album marked Williams' first major work with former longtime collaborator Guy Chambers since 2002's Escapology. Chambers produced the album and co-wrote most of the album's new material with Williams.

The album was released on 15 November 2013 and debuted atop the UK Albums Chart with first-week sales of 109,000 copies, becoming the UK's 1,000th number one album. It was also Williams' eleventh album to top the chart, putting him joint-second with Elvis Presley for the most UK number one albums. Internationally, the album charted strongly and charted in the top 10 in Ireland, Australia, Belgium, Italy and Sweden, in addition to reaching number one in Austria, Croatia, Germany and Switzerland. As of June 2014, the album has sold over 1.6 million copies worldwide. According to the International Federation of the Phonographic Industry (IFPI), Swings Both Ways was the 18th global best-selling album of 2013.

== Background ==
Swings Both Ways was announced by Williams in September 2013. It was released in the UK by Island Records on 18 November 2013. The album features cover versions of well known songs, as well as six new tracks written by Williams and Guy Chambers, who also produced the album. Swings Both Ways also features duets between Williams and Lily Allen, Michael Bublé, Kelly Clarkson, Olly Murs, and Rufus Wainwright, on both classic and new material.

Williams stated "First of all, I wanted to do a swing album because I wanted to do a swing album. I always knew I'd do another and I think now is the perfect time to do it. I'm enjoying showbiz and I'm enjoying my life and my understanding of where I am now is that there needs to be an event every time I bring out a record. The album this time is a definite ode and a loving glance towards a period on the planet that I was never invited to 'coz I wasn't there… I wanted to be, which I feel still very strongly linked to." He added that Swings Both Ways was originally going to be similar to his first swing album Swing When You're Winning, but he later changed his mind and added the original tracks: "Going in I planned it to be very similar to the last one, and then I realized – that’s actually not what I wanted. It’s different – it’s not all covers, I had some songs that I wanted the world to hear and check out and maybe become part of the fabric of their lives, if I’m lucky enough, that I’ve had a hand in writing. So it’s very very similar to the last one, and very different – and hopefully I’m off to romance the world!"

Lily Allen said of her collaboration with Williams: "‘Dream A Little Dream’ is one of my favourite songs of all time so I didn’t hesitate when Robbie asked me if I’d like to duet with him on it. I was a bit nervous when we recorded it, especially when I asked him what he wanted me to do and he said something like ‘just be you’. But I’m really happy with it and think we do justice to a classic song." Murs also commented on his first collaboration with his long-time friend: "I absolutely loved working with Rob on this album. After touring Europe with him this year it seemed only right that we record something together, and “I Wan’na Be Like You” is such a classic sing-a-long tune. It’s always brilliant when you get to work with your mates!" Wainwright also spoke of his duet with Williams: "Working with Robbie is a dream come true. I’m once again the envy of both sexes. Robbie is the real deal, full package, a total mensch and if I could come up with any more paired descriptive sayings I would use them as well."

== Singles ==
"Go Gentle" was released as the album's official lead single on 10 November 2013.

The album's second single "Dream a Little Dream" was released on 13 December 2013.

"Shine My Shoes" was released as a promotional single on 12 September 2013, upon pre-orders of the album being made available. The track premiered on radio that morning, and shortly after an official audio stream was released to YouTube. It was released digitally as the third single from the album on 24 March 2014.

== Chart performance ==
In the UK, the album opened at number one (which became the 1,000th UK number one album) with 109,000 copies sold. During its second week, Swings Both Ways dropped to number three, the following week the album climbed to number two, the following week the album climbed back to number one in its fourth week, selling 126,000 copies – an increase of 31% from the previous week. Williams secured the Christmas album number one with sales of 126,000 copies. The album was the fourth best-selling album of 2013 (excluding multi-artist compilations) with 626,000 copies sold for the year.

== Critical reception ==
Professional ratings
Aggregate scores
Source	Rating
Metacritic	58/100
Review scores
Source	Rating
Daily Express	5/5 stars
Digital Spy	4/5 stars
The Guardian	3/5 stars
The Independent	3/5 stars
Metro	3/5 stars
musicOMH	3/5 stars
The National	4/5 stars
The New Zealand Herald	3/5 stars
The Observer	2/5 stars
Time Out London	3/5 stars

Swings Both Ways has received mixed to positive reviews from music critics. As of December 2013, the album holds an aggregate score of 58 out of 100 assigned by Metacritic, based on 7 reviews.

== Track listing ==
All tracks produced by Guy Chambers, with the exception of "Wedding Bells" which was produced by Steve Power.

Swings Both Ways – Standard edition
No.	Title	Writer(s)	Length
1.	"Shine My Shoes"	Robbie Williams; Guy Chambers; Chris Heath	3:23
2.	"Go Gentle"	Williams; Chambers; Heath	4:31
3.	"I Wan'na Be Like You" (featuring Olly Murs)	Richard M. Sherman; Robert B. Sherman	3:31
4.	"Swing Supreme"	Williams; Chambers; Dino Fekaris; Frederick Perren	3:17
5.	"Swings Both Ways" (featuring Rufus Wainwright)	Williams; Chambers; Rufus Wainwright	3:58
6.	"Dream a Little Dream" (featuring Lily Allen)	Fabian Andre; Gus Kahn; Wilbur Schwandt	3:33
7.	"Soda Pop" (featuring Michael Bublé)	Williams; Kelvin Andrews; Scott Ralph; Rich Scott; Danny Spencer	3:19
8.	"Snowblind"	Williams; Chambers	3:19
9.	"Puttin' On the Ritz"	Irving Berlin	2:32
10.	"Little Green Apples" (featuring Kelly Clarkson)	Bobby Russell	3:16
11.	"Minnie the Moocher"	Cab Calloway; Irving Mills; Clarence Gaskill	3:41
12.	"If I Only Had a Brain"	Harold Arlen; Yip Harburg	3:52
13.	"No One Likes a Fat Pop Star"	Williams; Chambers; Heath	2:52

Swings Both Ways – Deluxe edition bonus tracks
No.	Title	Writer(s)	Length
14.	"Where There's Muck"	Williams; Guy Chambers	4:09
15.	"16 Tons"	Merle Travis	2:36
16.	"Wedding Bells"	Williams; Gary Barlow	4:35

DVD – Deluxe edition bonus tracks
No.	Title	Writer(s)	Length
1.	"Dream a Little Dream" (video)	Fabian Andre; Gus Kahn; Wilbur Schwandt	1:22
2.	"Soda Pop" (video)	Williams; Kelvin Andrews; Scott Ralph; Rich Scott; Danny Spencer	3:37
3.	"I Wan'na Be Like You" (video)	Richard M. Sherman; Robert B. Sherman	1:56
4.	"Swings Both Ways" (video)	Williams; Chambers; Rufus Wainwright	4:03
5.	"Gallery"		3:23

== Charts ==
=== Weekly charts ===
Chart (2013–2014)	Peak position
Australian Albums (ARIA)	2
Austrian Albums (Ö3 Austria)	1
Belgian Albums (Ultratop Flanders)	4
Belgian Albums (Ultratop Wallonia)	13
Croatian Albums (Croatian Albums Chart)	1
China Albums (Sino Chart)	26
Czech Albums (ČNS IFPI)	5
Danish Albums (Hitlisten)	2
Dutch Albums (Album Top 100)	2
Finnish Albums (Suomen virallinen lista)	18
French Albums (SNEP)	38
German Albums (Offizielle Top 100)	1
Hungarian Albums (MAHASZ)	5
Irish Albums (IRMA)	2
Italian Albums (FIMI)	5
Italian Albums (Musica e dischi)	5
Mexican Albums (AMPROFON)	50
New Zealand Albums (RMNZ)	12
Norwegian Albums (VG-lista)	7
Polish Albums (ZPAV)	20
Portuguese Albums (AFP)	19
Scottish Albums (Official Charts)	1
South Korean Albums (Gaon Chart)	24
Spanish Albums (Promusicae)	13
Swedish Albums (Sverigetopplistan)	5
Swiss Albums (Schweizer Hitparade)	1
Taiwanese Albums (Five Music)	11
UK Albums (Official Charts)	1
US Top Current Albums (Billboard)	194

=== Year-end charts ===
Chart (2013)	Position
Australian Albums (ARIA)	53
Austrian Albums (Ö3 Austria)	3
Belgian Albums (Ultratop Flanders)	114
Belgian Albums (Ultratop Wallonia)	129
Dutch Albums (Album Top 100)	22
German Albums (Offizielle Top 100)	2
Hungarian Albums (MAHASZ)	30
Italian Albums (FIMI)	45
Swedish Albums (Sverigetopplistan)	58
Swiss Albums (Schweizer Hitparade)	18
UK Albums (OCC)	4

Chart (2014)	Position
Australian Albums (ARIA)	45
Austrian Albums (Ö3 Austria)	5
Dutch Albums (Album Top 100)	94
German Albums (Offizielle Top 100)	53
UK Albums (OCC)	70

=== Decade-end charts ===
Chart (2010–2019)	Position
UK Albums (OCC)	85

== Certifications ==
Region	Certification	Certified units/sales
Australia (ARIA)	Platinum	70,000^{^}
Austria (IFPI Austria)	4× Platinum	60,000^{*}
Denmark (IFPI Danmark)	Gold	10,000^{^}
Germany (BVMI)	5× Gold	500,000^{‡}
Hungary (MAHASZ)	Gold	1,000^{^}
Ireland (IRMA)	Gold	7,500^{^}
Italy (FIMI)	Gold	30,000^{*}
New Zealand (RMNZ)	Gold	7,500^{^}
Poland (ZPAV)	Gold	10,000^{‡}
Switzerland (IFPI Switzerland)	Platinum	20,000^{^}
United Kingdom (BPI)	2× Platinum	626,000
Summaries
Europe (IFPI)	Platinum	1,000,000^{*}
^{*} Sales figures based on certification alone.^{^} Shipments figures based on certification alone.^{‡} Sales+streaming figures based on certification alone.

== Release history ==
Country	Release date	Format	Label
Germany	15 November 2013	CD, digital download	Island Records
United Kingdom	18 November 2013	CD, digital download	Island Records
United States	18 November 2013	CD, digital download	Island Records
