= Candy (Robbie Williams song) =

2012 single by Robbie Williams

Single by Robbie Williams

from the album Take the Crown
- Released: 11 September 2012
- Recorded: 2011–2012
- Genre: Pop
- Length: 3:21
- Label: Island; Universal
- Songwriters: Robbie Williams; Gary Barlow; Terje Olsen
- Producer: Jacknife Lee

Robbie Williams singles chronology
"Shame" (2010)	"Candy" (2012)	"Different" (2012)

Music video
- "Candy" on YouTube

Audio sample
- file; help

"Candy" is a song by English pop singer Robbie Williams, released on 11 September 2012 as the lead single from his ninth studio album Take the Crown. It was written by Williams and Gary Barlow, interpolating a riff from "Eurodans" by Terje Olsen. The song was Williams's first UK number-one single since "Radio" in 2004.

The track premiered on BBC Radio 1 just days before the station removed Williams from their playlist, deeming him no longer relevant to their target audience of 15-29. Williams protested the decision, citing Radio 1 as a pop star's "main oxygen". When the song reached number one without Radio 1 airplay, the singer thanked the station, who "have supported me for a long, long time and I'm very grateful to them. Oh, and I can still have number ones without them!"

== Background and release ==
The track was originally rumoured to be titled "Vertigo". Williams said of the track: "It's a summer song, very much in a similar vein to 'Rock DJ', about a girl who thinks she's great. And she might be, but she's a bit nefarious with her ways. Some songs take an age to write and some songs just fall out of your mouth completely formed, and you don't have to think about it. I don't know why that fell out of my mouth and out of my brain at that particular time – it just did." On 10 September, Williams debuted "Candy" on Radio 2's Breakfast Show with host Chris Evans. The official artwork for the track features a model of Williams's head covered in pink and red spots against a pink background.

"Candy" was written by Robbie Williams, Gary Barlow and Terje Olsen, while production was handled by Jacknife Lee. The song interpolates Norwegian producer Todd Terje's single "Eurodans". In the hook, he uses nursery rhymes about the plague (Ring a Ring o' Roses) and taxes. "Hey ho here she goes/ Either a little too high or a little too low/ Got no self-esteem and vertigo/ Cause she thinks she's made of candy," Williams chants on the chorus. The song contains melodic elements of the nursery rhyme Ring a Ring o' Roses and even contains the title of the rhyme at the start of the second verse.

== Reception ==
=== Critical response ===
Lewis Corner of Digital Spy gave the song 4 out of 5 stars, writing that "'Candy' doesn't touch the dizzying heights of 'Rock DJ' or 'Angels', but it's also far from his worst song to date." Corner also wrote: "Robbie chants on a bouncy, playground chant of a chorus brassier than his stage persona – and there within lies the charm." John Bush of AllMusic wrote that "The trailer single 'Candy' is a trite, uptempo track with a sing-song chorus but not much of a shelf life, it's the perfect radio hit." Sam Lanksy of Idolator wrote the song "is sprightly and spunky with a clever hook – arguably the best sweets-related diss since Annie's 'Chewing Gum'." Tom Hocknell of BBC Music called it "catchier than Velcro, although it’s unclear why anyone needs to own it – after the second listen it owns you. It’s eager to please, certainly."

Alexis Petridis of The Guardian was less positive, writing that "[...] It's so desperate to be a smash hit that it ends up sounding like one of those novelty singles that used to blight the September charts, bought by returning holidaymakers with rosy memories of the hotel disco; all it's lacking is an accompanying dance." Philip Matusavage of musicOMH also gave the song a mixed review, writing that "It's a neat précis of the problems facing Robbie in 2012. Its bouncy dancehall brass is undeniably and infectiously catchy but it’s also short-lived; the song leaves no impression at its end." Kitty Empire of The Observer observed that "it would better suit a boy band in a Caribbean time warp. But somehow, it looks as if it will re-establish Williams's presence in the charts today, regardless."

=== Chart performance ===
In Germany, "Candy" broke an airplay record for the most plays in a week. It peaked at number 3 on the main chart. In Austria, the song was a success, debuting and peaking, for three consecutive weeks, at number 4 on the Ö3 Austria Top 40 chart. "Candy" was a growing success in the Netherlands, debuting at number 27 on the Dutch Top 40 chart. After six weeks climbing the charts, the song entered the top-ten, reaching number 6, on 10 November 2012. In the Dutch Mega Top 100 "Candy" reached number 1 on 17 November 2012. It reached top 10 in more than 20 countries, and Top 40 in other territories including Japan and New Zealand.

In his native UK, despite BBC Radio 1 not putting it on their playlist, "Candy" gathered over 10,000 radio spins before the official digital release. The song later achieved more than 30,000 spins on UK radio. On the UK Singles Chart, "Candy" became the singer's first number-one in eight years (the last being 2004's "Radio"), his seventh solo UK number-one and the 14th number-one of his career (including Take That and solo material). It also became his fastest-selling single in the UK since "Rock DJ" 12 years earlier, and with 137,000 copies sold that week, it also became the fastest-selling male artist single of the year, and the third fastest-selling single of 2012 overall. The song remained number one on the UK Singles Chart for a second week, shifting 90,000 copies. It was the 22nd best-selling single of 2012 in the UK, with sales of 503,000. In June 2013, "Candy" became Robbie's second biggest hit in the UK, after "Angels", with sales passing the 650,000 mark.

== Music video ==
A music video to accompany the release of "Candy" was first released onto YouTube on 10 September 2012 at a total length of three minutes and twenty-four seconds. It stars Robbie Williams and Kaya Scodelario. The video was filmed in Spitalfields in east London in summer 2012 and was directed by Joseph Kahn. In the video Williams plays a guardian angel figure protecting an absentminded woman named Candice (as referenced in the lyrics of the song: "I was there to witness/Candice's inner business") who is looking at her phone the whole time, resulting in various accidents.

== Formats and track listings ==
Digital download
No.	Title	Length
1.	"Candy"	3:21

Digital EP and Brazilian promo CD single
No.	Title	Length
1.	"Candy"	3:21
2.	"Candy" (Max Sanna & Steve Pitron Remix)	6:52
3.	"Candy" (Major Look Remix)	4:26
4.	"Candy" (More Candy)	7:07

CD single
No.	Title	Length
1.	"Candy"	3:21
2.	"Candy" (Max Sanna & Steve Pitron Remix)	6:56

2013 Brit Awards
No.	Title	Length
1.	"Candy" (live from the BRITs)	3:30

== Credits and personnel ==
- Lead vocals – Robbie Williams
- Producers – Jacknife Lee, Terje Olsen
- Lyrics – Gary Barlow, Robbie Williams
- Music – Gary Barlow, Terje Olsen
- Label - Universal Records

== Charts ==
=== Weekly charts ===
Weekly chart performance for "Candy"
Chart (2012)	Peak position
Argentina (CAPIF)	14
Australia (ARIA)	59
Austria (Ö3 Austria Top 40)	4
Belgium (Ultratop 50 Flanders)	18
Belgium (Ultratop 50 Wallonia)	9
CIS Airplay (TopHit)	112
Czech Republic Airplay (ČNS IFPI)	2
Denmark (Tracklisten)	10
Europe (Euro Digital Songs)	1
Finland Airplay (Radiosoittolista)	5
France (SNEP)	14
Germany (GfK)	3
German Airplay (Nielsen Soundscan)	1
Hungary (Rádiós Top 40)	6
Ireland (IRMA)	2
Israel International Airplay (Media Forest)	6
Italy (FIMI)	2
Italy (Musica e dischi)	1
Italian Airplay (EarOne)	1
Japan Hot 100 (Billboard)	39
Latvia (Latvijas Top 40)	1
Lebanon (The Official Lebanese Top 20)	2
Luxembourg Digital (Billboard)	5
Mexican Inglés Airplay (Billboard)	4
Netherlands (Dutch Top 40)	3
Netherlands (Single Top 100)	1
Netherlands Airplay (Nielsen Soundscan)	1
New Zealand (Recorded Music NZ)	18
Norway Digital Songs (Billboard)	10
Scottish Singles Sales (Official Charts)	1
Slovakia Airplay (ČNS IFPI)	6
Spain (Promusicae)	21
Sweden (DigiListan)	9
Sweden (Sverigetopplistan)	42
Switzerland (Schweizer Hitparade)	8
UK Singles (Official Charts)	1
UK Airplay (Music Week)	2

=== Year-end charts ===
2012 year-end chart performance for "Candy"
Chart (2012)	Position
Austria (Ö3 Austria Top 40)	55
France (SNEP)	200
Germany (Official German Charts)	31
Hungary (Rádiós Top 40)	40
Italy (FIMI)	26
Italy Airplay (EarOne)	34
Netherlands (Dutch Top 40)	32
Netherlands (Single Top 100)	27
UK Singles (OCC)	22

2013 year-end chart performance for "Candy"
Chart (2013)	Position
Italy (Musica e dischi)	90
Netherlands (Dutch Top 40)	57

== Certifications ==
Certifications for "Candy"
Region	Certification	Certified units/sales
Austria (IFPI Austria)	Gold	15,000^{*}
Germany (BVMI)	Gold	150,000^{^}
Italy (FIMI)	2× Platinum	60,000^{*}
New Zealand (RMNZ)	Gold	7,500^{*}
Switzerland (IFPI Switzerland)	Gold	15,000^{^}
United Kingdom (BPI)	2× Platinum	1,200,000^{‡}
^{*} Sales figures based on certification alone.^{^} Shipments figures based on certification alone.^{‡} Sales+streaming figures based on certification alone.

== Release history ==
Release dates for "Candy"
Country	Date	Format
Various	25 September 2012	Digital download
United Kingdom	28 October 2012	Digital download
Germany, Switzerland and Austria	2 October 2012	Digital download
Germany, Switzerland and Austria	8 October 2012	CD single
