= Robbie Williams =

English singer (born 1974)

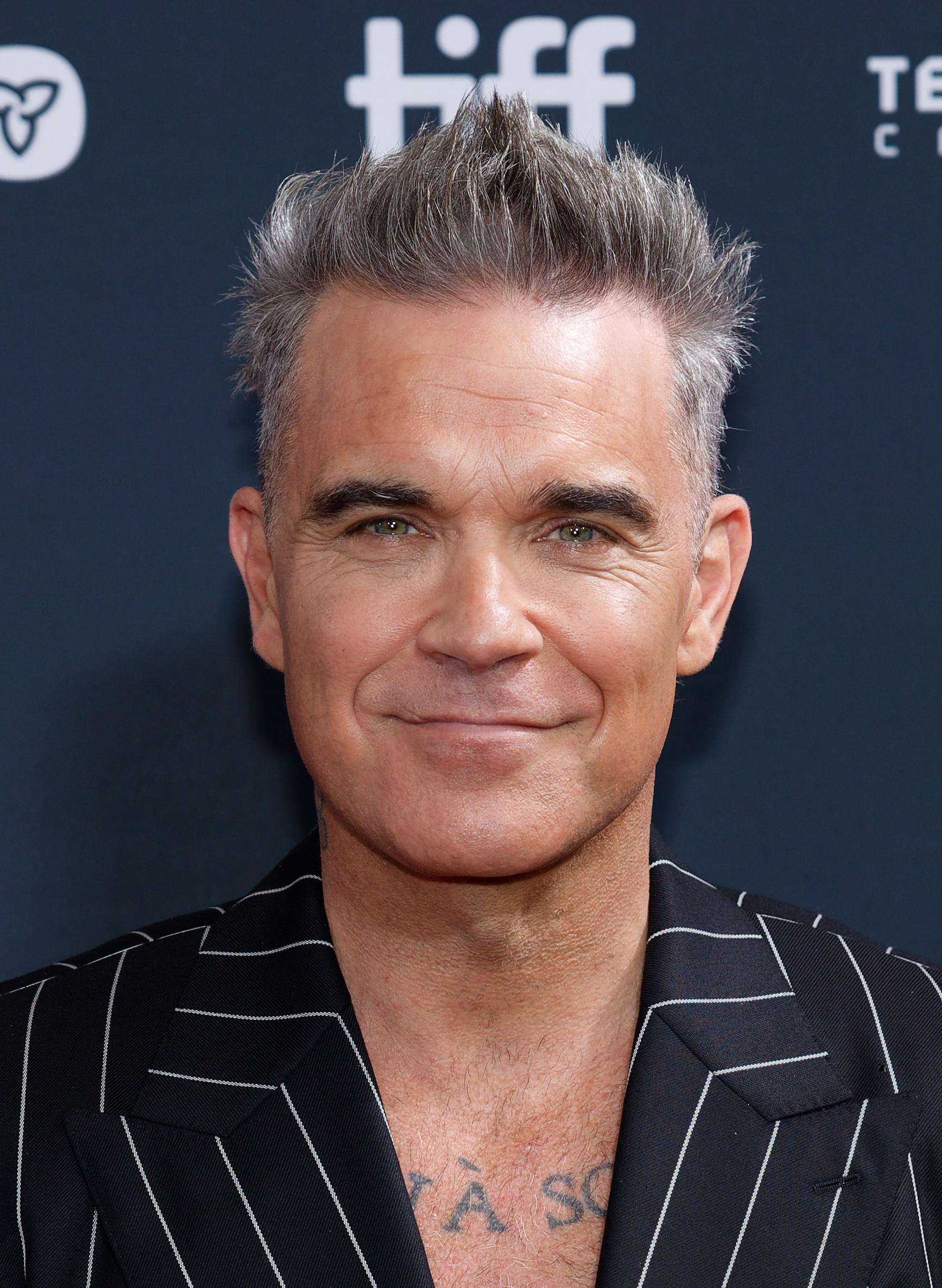
- Williams at the 2024 Toronto International Film Festival

Background information
- Born: Robert Peter Williams; 13 February 1974 (age 52); Stoke-on-Trent, Staffordshire, England
- Genres: Pop; pop rock; soft rock; electronic dance; alternative rock
- Occupations: Singer; songwriter
- Years active: 1990–present
- Labels: Columbia; Island/Universal; Virgin; EMI/Chrysalis
- Member of: Lufthaus
- Formerly of: Take That
- Spouse: Ayda Field (m. 2010)
- Children: 4
- Website: robbiewilliams.com

Robert Peter Williams (born 13 February 1974) is an English singer and songwriter. He found fame as a member of the pop group Take That from 1990 to 1995, launching a solo career in 1996. His debut studio album, Life thru a Lens, was released in 1997, and included his best-selling single "Angels". His second album, I've Been Expecting You, featured the songs "Millennium" and "She's the One", his first and second number one singles. His discography includes seven UK No. 1 singles, and all but one of his 14 studio albums have reached No. 1 in the UK. Six of his albums are among the top 100 biggest-selling albums in the UK, with two of them in the top 60, and he gained a Guinness World Record in 2006 for selling 1.6 million tickets in a single day during his Close Encounters Tour.

Williams has received a record 18 Brit Awards, winning Best British Male Artist four times, Outstanding Contribution to Music twice, an Icon Award for his lasting impact on British culture, eight German ECHO Awards, and three MTV European Music Awards. In 2004, he was inducted into the UK Music Hall of Fame after being voted the Greatest Artist of the 1990s. According to the British Phonographic Industry (BPI), he has been certified for 20.36 million albums and 11.4 million singles in the UK as a solo artist. Five of his albums have also topped the Australian albums chart, and he has sold an estimated 75 million to 80 million records worldwide, making him one of the best-selling music artists of all time. He also topped the 2000–2010 UK airplay chart. His three concerts at Knebworth in 2003 drew over 375,000 people, the UK's biggest music event to that point. In 2014, he was awarded the freedom of his hometown of Stoke-on-Trent and had a tourist trail created and streets named in his honour. Williams' latest compilation album, XXV, was released in 2022.

After 15 years, Williams rejoined Take That in 2010 to co-write and perform lead vocals on their album Progress, which became the second-fastest-selling album in UK chart history and the fastest-selling record of the century at the time. The subsequent stadium tour, which featured seven songs from Williams' solo career, became the biggest-selling concert in UK history when it sold 1.34 million tickets in less than 24 hours. In 2011, Take That frontman Gary Barlow confirmed that Williams had left the band for a second time to focus on his solo career, although he stated that the departure was amicable and that Williams was welcome to rejoin Take That in the future. Williams has since performed with Take That on three separate television appearances, and collaborated with Barlow on a number of projects such as the West End musical The Band. A film based on Williams' life, Better Man, was released in 2024.

== Early life ==
Robert Peter Williams was born on 13 February 1974 in Stoke-on-Trent, the son of Janet (née Farrell) and Peter Williams (also known as Pete Conway), who ran a pub called the Red Lion in Burslem before becoming the licensee at the Port Vale Social Club. His maternal grandfather was an Irishman from Kilkenny. He attended St Margaret Ward Catholic School in Tunstall and participated in several school plays, most notably in the role of the Artful Dodger in a production of Oliver!

== Take That ==
=== 1990–1995: First stint ===
In 1990, the sixteen-year-old Williams was the youngest member to join Take That. According to the documentary Take That: For the Record, his mother read an advertisement seeking members for a new boy band and suggested that he try out for the group. He met fellow member Mark Owen on the day of his audition/interview with Nigel Martin-Smith. Although the majority of the group's material was written and performed by Gary Barlow, Williams performed lead vocals on three hits "Could It Be Magic", "I Found Heaven", and "Everything Changes". Williams' use of alcohol and cocaine brought him into conflict with Martin-Smith over the behaviour rules for Take That members.

In November 1994, Williams's drug use had escalated; he nearly had a drug overdose the night before the group was scheduled to perform at the MTV Europe Music Awards. According to the documentary For the Record, he was unhappy with his musical ideas not being taken seriously by Martin-Smith and lead singer Barlow; his desire to explore hip-hop and rap conflicted with Take That's usual ballads. Barlow stated in interviews that Williams had given up trying to offer creative input.

Noting Williams's increasingly belligerent behaviour and poor attendance at rehearsals, and worried that he might leave the group during their upcoming tour, Barlow and Jason Orange took their concerns to Martin-Smith. During one of the last rehearsals before the tour commenced, the three confronted Williams about his attitude and stated they wanted to do the tour without him. He agreed to quit and left the group in July 1995. Despite the departure of Williams, Take That completed their Nobody Else Tour as a four-piece. They later disbanded on 13 February 1996, Williams's 22nd birthday.

Shortly afterwards, Williams was photographed by the press partying with the members of Oasis at Glastonbury Festival. Following his departure, he became the subject of talk shows and newspapers as he acknowledged his plans to become a solo singer. A clause in his Take That contract prohibited him from releasing any material until after the group was officially dissolved, and he was later sued by Martin-Smith and forced to pay $200,000 in commission. After various legal battles over his right to a solo career, Williams was released from his contract with BMG. On 27 June 1996, he signed with Chrysalis Records.

=== 2006–2011: Second stint ===
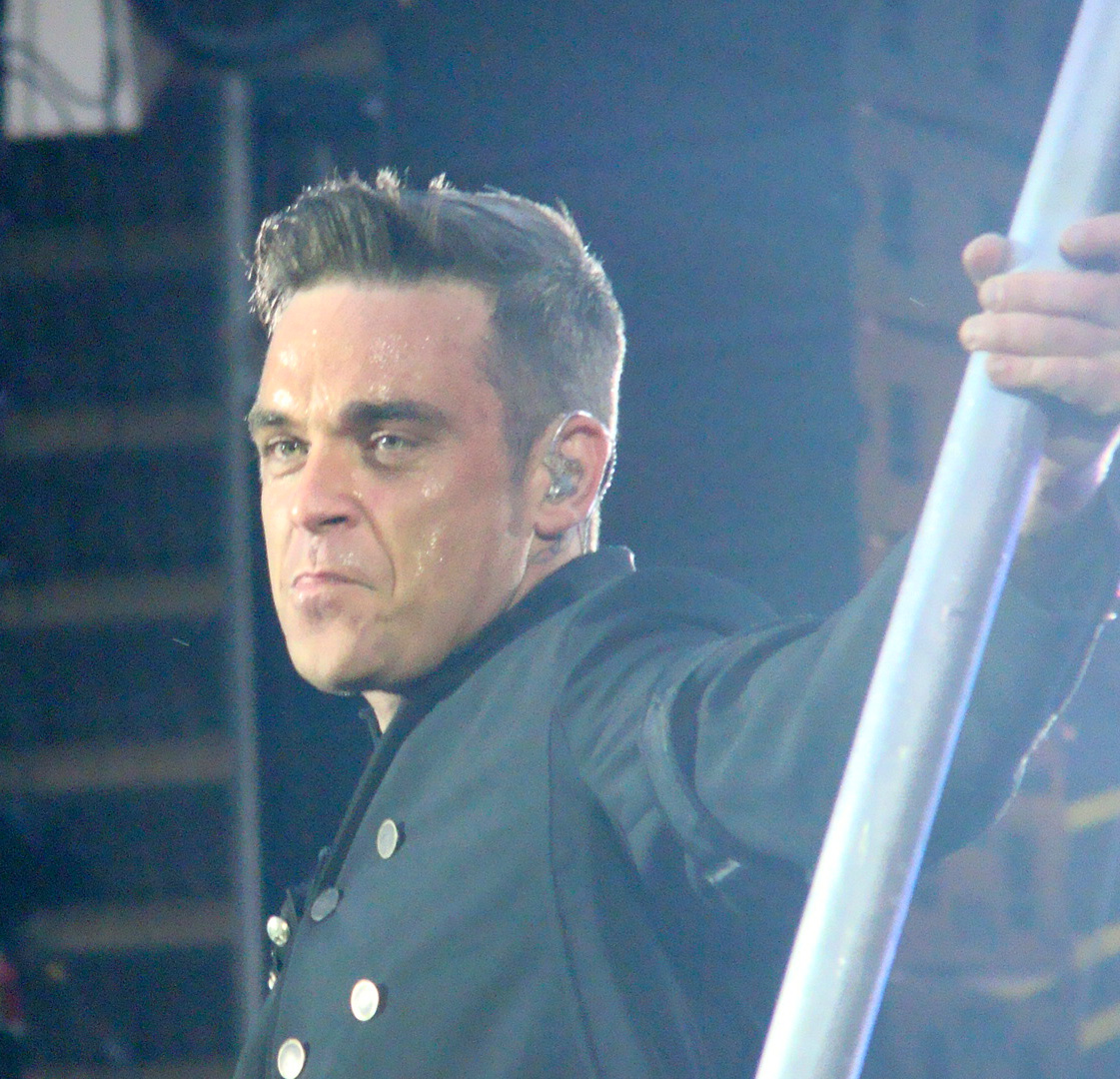
Williams performing in Take That's Progress Live tour in 2011. He rejoined the group in July 2010 and said he is open to another reunion in the future.

By March 2009, Williams had shown interest in rejoining Take That; the band completed their tour, The Circus Live, without him. In spite of rumours that Williams was working in New York with Take That in September that year, by the day of the Children in Need charity concert at the Royal Albert Hall in November they were still performing separately. Both did join with the other acts in the final song of the evening, with Williams putting his arm around Gary Barlow and singing "Hey Jude".

On 15 July 2010, Williams reconciled with his former colleagues and rejoined Take That. In November 2010 the Take That album Progress was released, becoming the fastest selling album since 2000 and the second fastest selling album in UK history. The group travelled across the UK on their Progress Live tour, which included eight nights at Wembley Stadium in London, then continued across Europe. The tour was the fastest selling in UK history with ticket hotlines and websites crashing under the demand.

In August 2012, Take That performed at the closing ceremony of the 2012 Summer Olympics. Williams was due to perform with Take That but missed the performance because his wife gave birth at around the same time; the group performed as a four-piece.

Although still officially part of Take That, Williams chose not to return for group's seventh and eighth studio albums and their accompanying tours, focusing instead on his solo commitments. He continued to write music with his colleagues and has performed with the group on several occasions since 2011's Progress tour and planned to return for a full tour to celebrate Take That's 30th anniversary in 2019.

== Solo career ==
=== 1996–1998: Life thru a Lens and I've Been Expecting You ===
Williams launched his solo career in 1996 with a cover of George Michael's "Freedom", which reached number two in the UK Singles Chart. Recordings for Williams's first album began at London's Maison Rouge studios in March 1997. Shortly after his introduction to songwriter and producer Guy Chambers, Williams released "Old Before I Die", the first single from his debut album. The single reached number two on the UK Charts; it was largely ignored on international charts. His debut album, Life thru a Lens, was released in September 1997. The album launched with his first live solo gig at the Élysée Montmartre theatre in Paris, France. The album debuted at number eleven on the UK Albums Chart.

"Angels", the fourth single, is Williams' best-seller in the United Kingdom. The song, apart from becoming a hit around Europe and Latin America, caused sales of his album to skyrocket. The album remained in the British top ten for forty weeks and spent 218 weeks there altogether, making it the 58th best selling album in UK history with sales of over 2.4 million. The album eventually managed to sell over three million copies in Europe.

Williams and Chambers started writing the second album, I've Been Expecting You, in Jamaica in early 1998. The first single, "Millennium", accompanied with a music video featuring Williams parodying James Bond, complete with tuxedo and references to Bond films like Thunderball and From Russia with Love, became Williams' first solo number one single in the United Kingdom. It also became a top twenty hit in many European countries, Latin America and Australia.

I've Been Expecting You was released in late October 1998 and debuted at number one in the UK Albums Chart. The album received more attention outside the United Kingdom, leaving its mark in the European and Latin American markets with hits such as "No Regrets", a collaboration with the Pet Shop Boys' singer Neil Tennant and the Divine Comedy's Neil Hannon. "She's the One", a cover of a World Party track written by Karl Wallinger, became Williams' second UK number-one single. Williams finished the year with a European Tour late in 1999. I've Been Expecting You sold almost 3 million copies in the UK and was certified 10× Platinum by the BPI. In Europe, the album sold over 4 million copies.

=== 1999–2001: Sing When You're Winning and Swing When You're Winning ===
In 1999, Williams was signed to Capitol Records in the United States, a part of EMI. He embarked on a United States promotional tour and released his first United States and Canadian single, "Millennium". The compilation album The Ego Has Landed was released in July 1999 in the United States and Canada. In the middle of promotion and the tours in 1999, Williams began work on his third studio album.

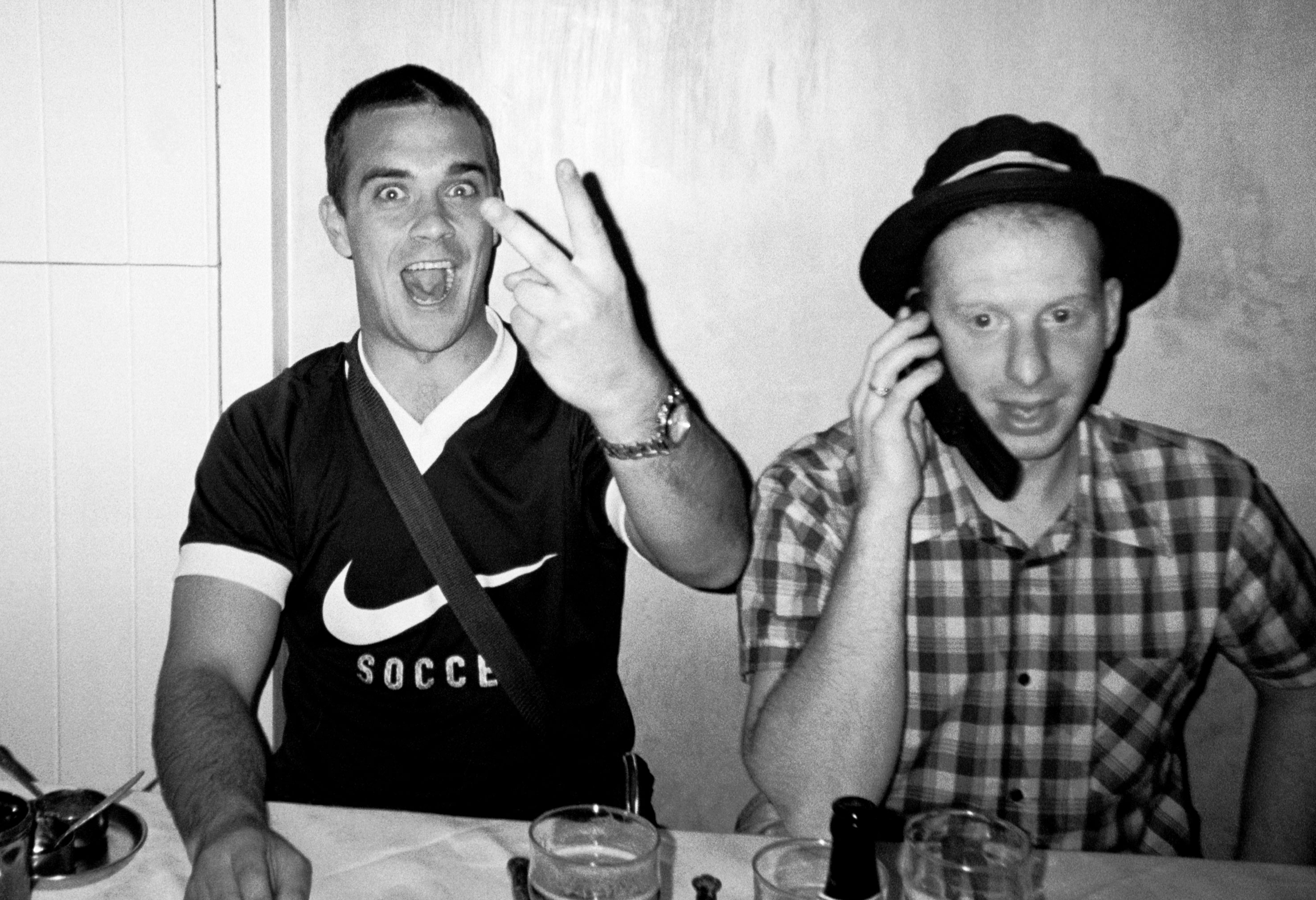
Williams, alongside Steve Furst, in London in 2000, gesturing to a paparazzi photographer

The first single taken from the album was "Rock DJ", a song inspired by Williams's UNICEF mentor, the late Ian Dury. The video created by Fred & Farid showed Williams in an attempt to get noticed by a group of women, first stripping and then tearing chunks of skin and muscle from his body, and caused controversy in the United Kingdom and many other countries. The video was edited by Top of the Pops for its graphic content and many other channels followed suit. The song became an instant hit, reaching number one in the UK (becoming his third number one single as a solo artist) and New Zealand. The song went on to win "Best Song of 2000" at the MTV Europe Music Awards, "Best Single of the Year" at the Brit Awards and an MTV Video Music Award for Best Special Effects.

When the album, Sing When You're Winning was released in August 2000, it topped the charts in many different countries. In the UK the album was certified 2× Platinum on its first week of release. After the success of his third album, Williams wanted to take another musical direction. He took two weeks off from his tour to record Swing When You're Winning, his fourth studio album. Born from his lifelong love for Frank Sinatra – combined with the success of the track "Have You Met Miss Jones?" that he recorded for the film Bridget Jones' Diary in 2001 – the album was recorded at Capitol Studios in Los Angeles.

Williams took the chance to duet with his long-time friend Jonathan Wilkes, Little Voice star Jane Horrocks, Saturday Night Live star Jon Lovitz, Rupert Everett and actress Nicole Kidman. The first single released from the album was a duet with Kidman, on "Somethin' Stupid". Originally a hit for Frank and Nancy Sinatra, the song became Williams' fifth number one hit in the UK. It eventually went on to become one of the biggest hits of 2001. "Beyond the Sea" was featured over the credits of the film Finding Nemo in 2003 and was also released on the film's soundtrack CD. A DVD, Robbie Williams Live at the Albert Hall, was released in December of that year and has become one of the best selling music DVDs in Europe, being certified 6× Platinum in the United Kingdom and 2× Platinum in Germany.

=== 2002–2005: Escapology and Intensive Care ===
In 2002, Williams signed a record-breaking £80 million contract with EMI. The contract included a number of provisos, including the label ceding greater creative control to the artist and a commitment to breaking Williams into the US market. It remains the biggest music deal in British history. The deal was brokered by Ingenious Media, a UK corporate finance advisory business. Williams began working on what would be his fifth studio album, spending a year in the recording studio. The album heralded a new era for Williams. He had taken a more active role in the making of this album. "One Fine Day", "Nan's Song", and "Come Undone" were the first songs that Williams wrote without the input of Guy Chambers. Most of the songs were recorded in Los Angeles.

"For the first time in my life, I'm speechless."

— Williams addresses the crowd during his three record-breaking concerts at Knebworth playing to 375,000 people, the biggest event in UK music history.

The album's first single, "Feel", written by Williams and Chambers, was recorded as a demo. When they started working on the album and were trying to re-record the vocals, Williams felt dissatisfied with it, so he decided to include the demo version and then release it as the first single. When the single was released in late 2002, it became Williams' biggest international hit, going number one in The Netherlands and Italy and reaching the top ten in many European countries. When Williams' fifth studio album, Escapology, was released in late 2002, it hit number one in at least 10 countries around the world. In the United States, it failed to make such an impact. Escapology sold almost 2 million copies by the end of 2003 in the United Kingdom. On 1–3 August 2003, Williams played three consecutive concerts at Knebworth to 125,000 people each night, making it the biggest event in UK music history. Memorable performances included "Come Undone" where he interjected with "Britain, I'm Your Son", and further interacted with the audience when he brought a girl up on stage. In October 2003, Williams released a live album of the concerts, Live at Knebworth.

In October 2004, Williams released Greatest Hits, a retrospective of his career, which also contained new tracks he had been working on with then-new collaborator Stephen Duffy. "Radio", the compilation's first single, debuted at number one in the UK Singles Chart, becoming Williams' sixth number-one hit. When the compilation was released, it debuted at number one in the UK and was the best selling album of the year in the UK and Europe. Eight years after the release of "Angels", the British public voted it as the "Best Single of the Past Twenty-Five Years" at the 2005 Brit Awards.

After touring Latin America in late 2004 for the promotion Greatest Hits, Williams started working on his sixth studio album. Recorded at his house in the Hollywood Hills, the album was co-written by Stephen Duffy over the course of 24 months. The album Intensive Care was launched in Berlin on 9 October. It became an international hit. In November 2005, Williams took home the MTV Europe Music Award for 'Best Male', but also, entered in The Guinness Book of World Records when he announced his World Tour for 2006, selling 1.6 million tickets in one single day. Williams kicked off his Close Encounters World Tour in South Africa in April 2006; when he finished his European leg of the tour, 2.5 million people had seen the show and, after touring Latin America and Australia, the numbers went up to 3 million.

=== 2006–2009: Rudebox and Reality Killed the Video Star ===
Williams released his much anticipated dance/electro album, Rudebox, on 23 October 2006. It featured collaborations with the Pet Shop Boys, William Orbit, Soul Mekanik, Joey Negro, Mark Ronson, Chris Grierson, and The Orr Boys. It received mixed reviews: Allmusic gave it a four star rating, the NME 8 out of 10, and Music Week and MOJO were equally positive, but it received much weaker reviews from some of the British press. The album sold 2× Platinum in Europe with sales of over 2 million making it the fastest platinum-selling album of 2006. To promote his album, Williams commissioned a series of short films. Goodbye to the Normals was directed by Jim Field Smith and features "Burslem Normals" by Williams.

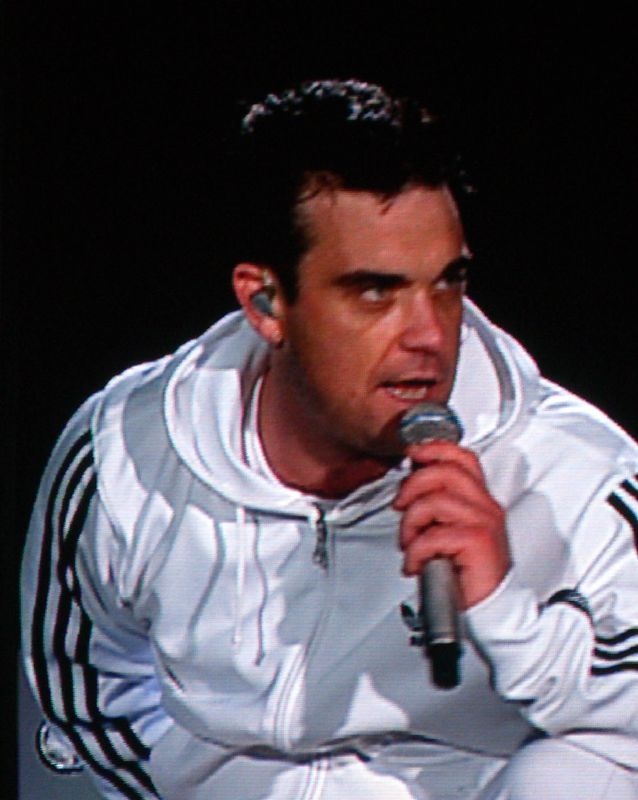
Williams at a concert in Vienna, Austria, in 2006

In February 2009, it was confirmed that Williams had written material with Guy Chambers and Mark Ronson. A spokesman said that Williams was planning to begin the recording sessions in March and that the new album would be released in late 2009. This will probably be the last Williams album released by EMI. On his official website, Williams confirmed that he was working with producer Trevor Horn on his new album, which would eventually be titled Reality Killed the Video Star, a reference to the song "Video Killed the Radio Star" by Horn's former band the Buggles. The album was released on 9 November 2009 in the United Kingdom.

On 11 October 2009 Williams published a 12-track compilation album, titled Songbook, as a free CD for the newspaper The Mail on Sunday. That same evening, Williams made his "comeback" on The X Factor results show, performing his new single "Bodies" for the first time live. On 20 October 2009 Williams opened the BBC Electric Proms at the London RoundHouse. It was his first live concert for 3 years and was broadcast across 200 cinemas worldwide. Accompanied by a string section, horn section, full band and producer Trevor Horn, Williams performed several new tracks from Reality Killed the Video Star and older tracks.

Reality Killed the Video Star was previewed in the UK on the Spotify music streaming service on 6 November 2009, and official released on 9 November. In a high-profile chart battle, Williams' album was pitted against X Factor 2008 runners-up JLS who released their debut album the same day. JLS beat Williams to the number one spot by 1500 sales. The album was also released in the United States (Williams' first album to be released there since 2002's Escapology). In late November 2009, Williams travelled to Australia to perform at the ARIA Music Awards of 2009.

=== 2010–2012: In and Out of Consciousness and Take the Crown ===
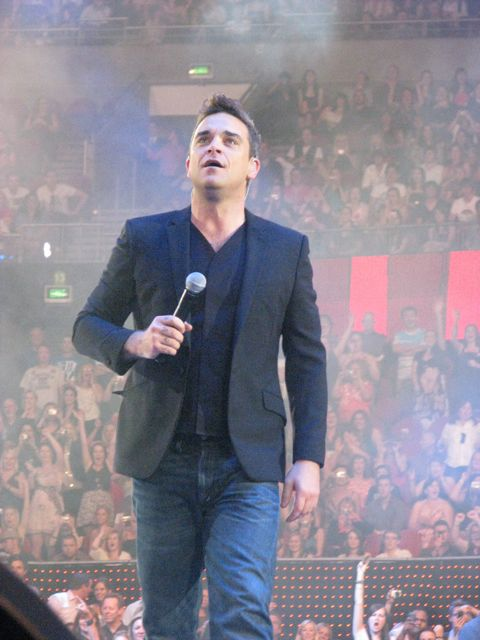
Williams performing at the Sydney Super Dome in 2009

In October 2010, Williams released his second greatest hits album, In and Out of Consciousness: The Greatest Hits 1990–2010, to celebrate 20 years as a performing artist. A single, "Shame", was also released, which was written and sung by Williams and Barlow.

On 21 October 2011 Williams signed with Island Records (Universal Music), following his departure from his previous record label EMI in 2010.

Williams was the opening act at the Diamond Jubilee Concert, which was co-organised by Gary Barlow, held outside Buckingham Palace on 4 June 2012. During the end of August his official website began a countdown to the release of information regarding his latest solo material, with an image of his face and his mind unveiled daily as the countdown expired. Titled Take the Crown, the album debuted at number one on the UK Albums Chart making it Williams' tenth number one album. It also marked the second time that Williams had a number one single ("Candy") and album at the same time on the chart. The first time was in 2001 when "Somethin' Stupid" and Swing When You're Winning were number one on the singles and albums chart respectively.

The album's lead single, "Candy", premiered on 10 September 2012 and was released on 11 September in most countries and 29 October in the UK. In the UK, "Candy" became Williams' first number one single since "Radio" (2004) and his seventh solo number one single. In its first week the song had sold 137,000 copies becoming the fastest-selling male artist single of the year. On 26 November 2012 Williams announced a 17 date stadium tour of Europe. Williams also confirmed that the support act for the tour would be Olly Murs who also duets with him on "Kids". Universal and EMI merged in 2012, bringing Williams' Chrysalis/Virgin recordings full circle to Universal.

=== 2013–2014: Swings Both Ways and Under the Radar Volume 1 ===
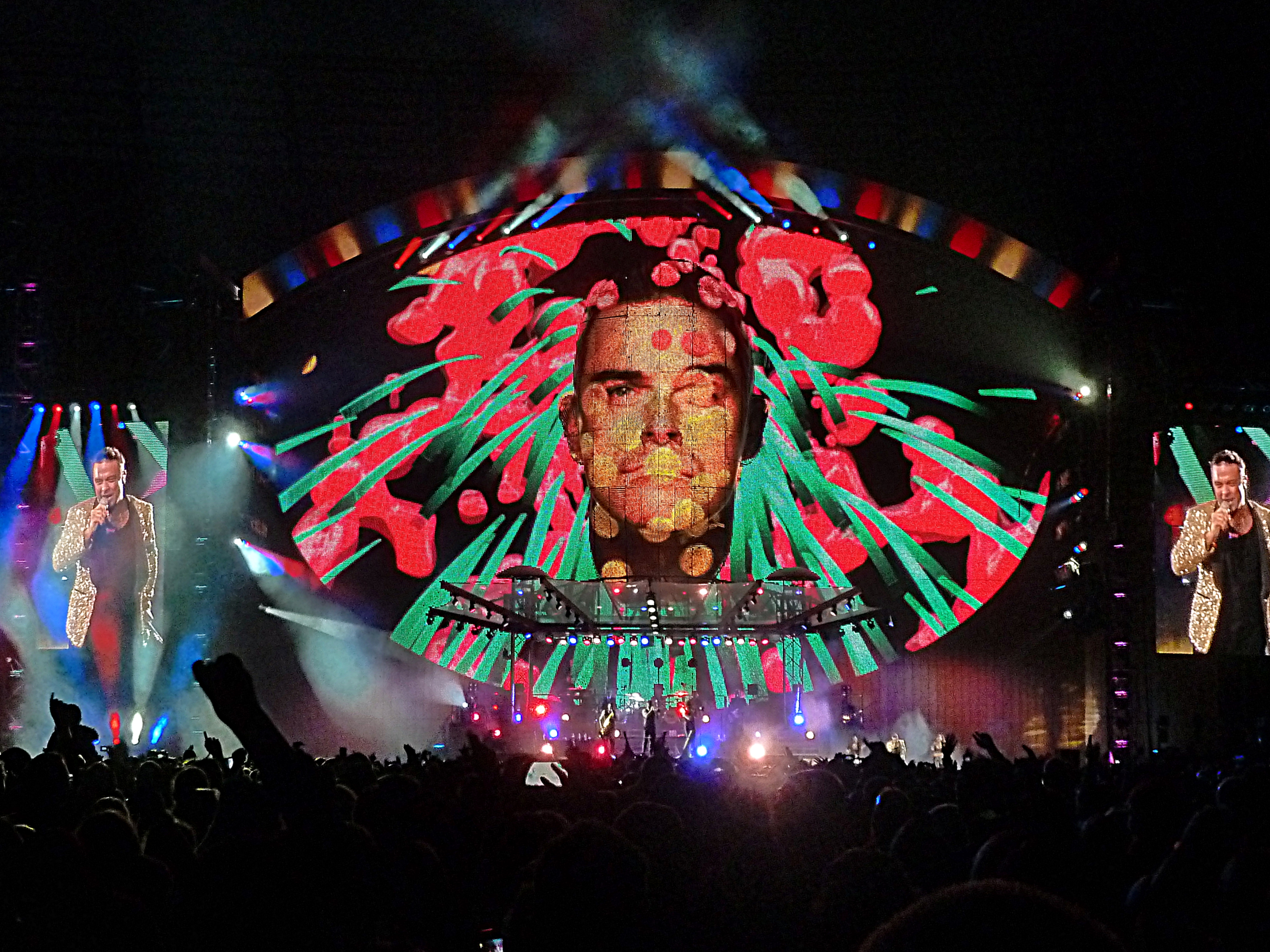
Williams on stage at the Etihad Stadium in Manchester during the Take the Crown Stadium Tour, June 2013

In September 2013, Williams announced a follow-up to his 2001 swing album, titled Swings Both Ways for release in November. The album features covers and original songs, whilst also including duet recordings with Michael Bublé, Olly Murs, Rufus Wainwright, Lily Allen and Kelly Clarkson. In November 2013, Williams made a cameo appearance in the video to Murs's song "Hand on Heart".

Williams released a compilation album entitled Under the Radar Volume 1 on 1 December 2014 through his website, featuring leftovers and unreleased songs. "[These are] loads and loads of songs that I have written that I am incredibly passionate about, I want you to hear them, otherwise they are just going to remain in my computer!" Williams said that Guy Chambers was "not happy" about these songs being released online: "He thinks I am a lunatic for not putting them on an album that we have promoted with TV performances and at radio stations and a big tour," Williams said. "But I am an impetuous bugger, and I want them out now, now, now!"

=== 2016–2018: The Heavy Entertainment Show, and The X Factor ===
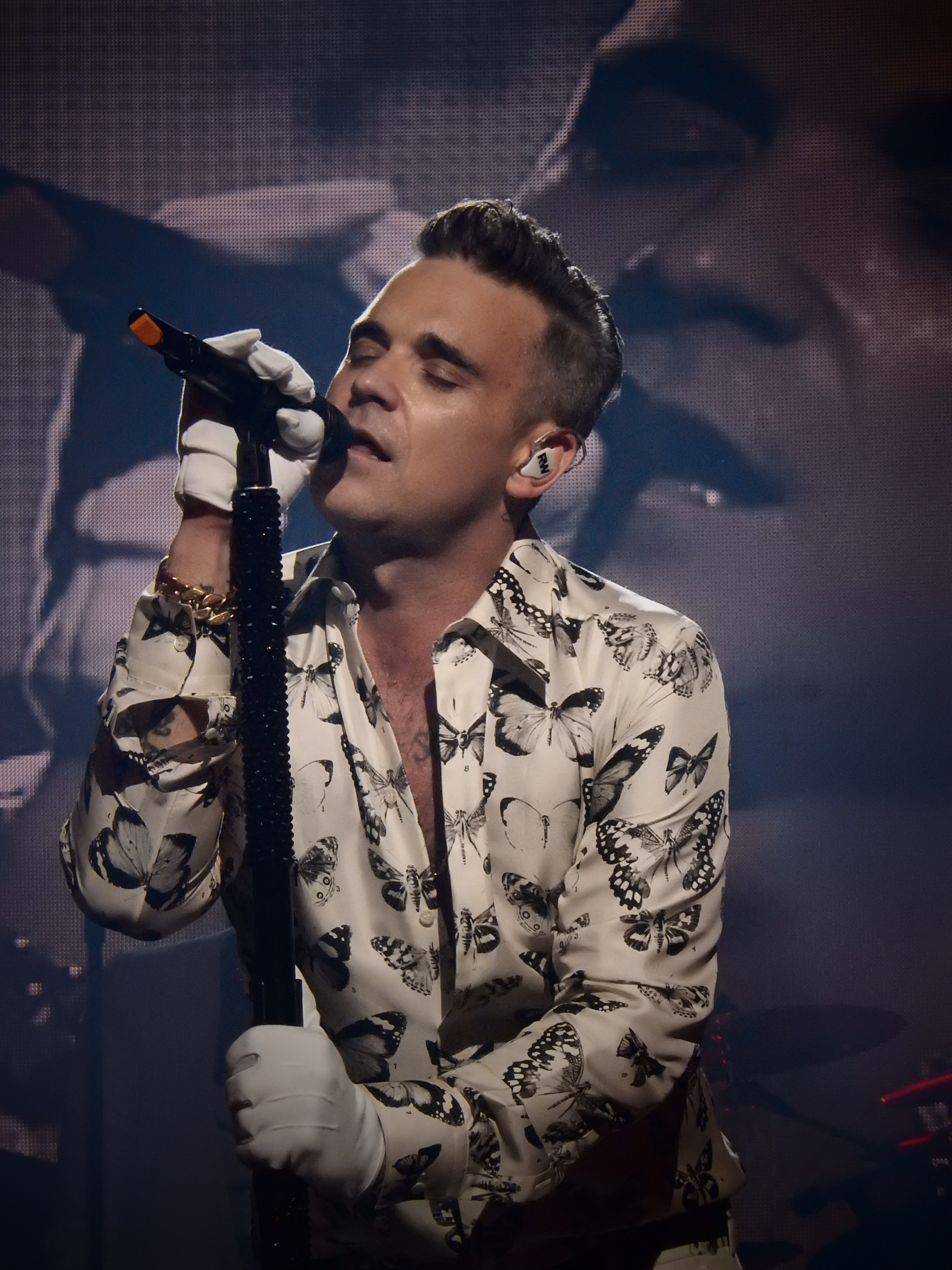
Williams performing at the Apple Music Festival in London, 25 September 2016

In May 2016, it was announced that Williams had signed a recording contract with Sony Music. In a statement, Williams said: "They're [Sony Music] inspired, I'm inspired. I'm more ready than I ever have been and I'm totally convinced I'm in the right place. I look forward to working on this album, which is an album I'm immensely proud of, in this exciting new partnership with Sony Music." The Heavy Entertainment Show became his 12th UK number-one album, putting him level with Madonna. In July 2017, Williams announced a new album, Under the Radar Volume 2, which was released in November 2017. A third edition in the Under the Radar series was released on Valentine's Day of 2019.

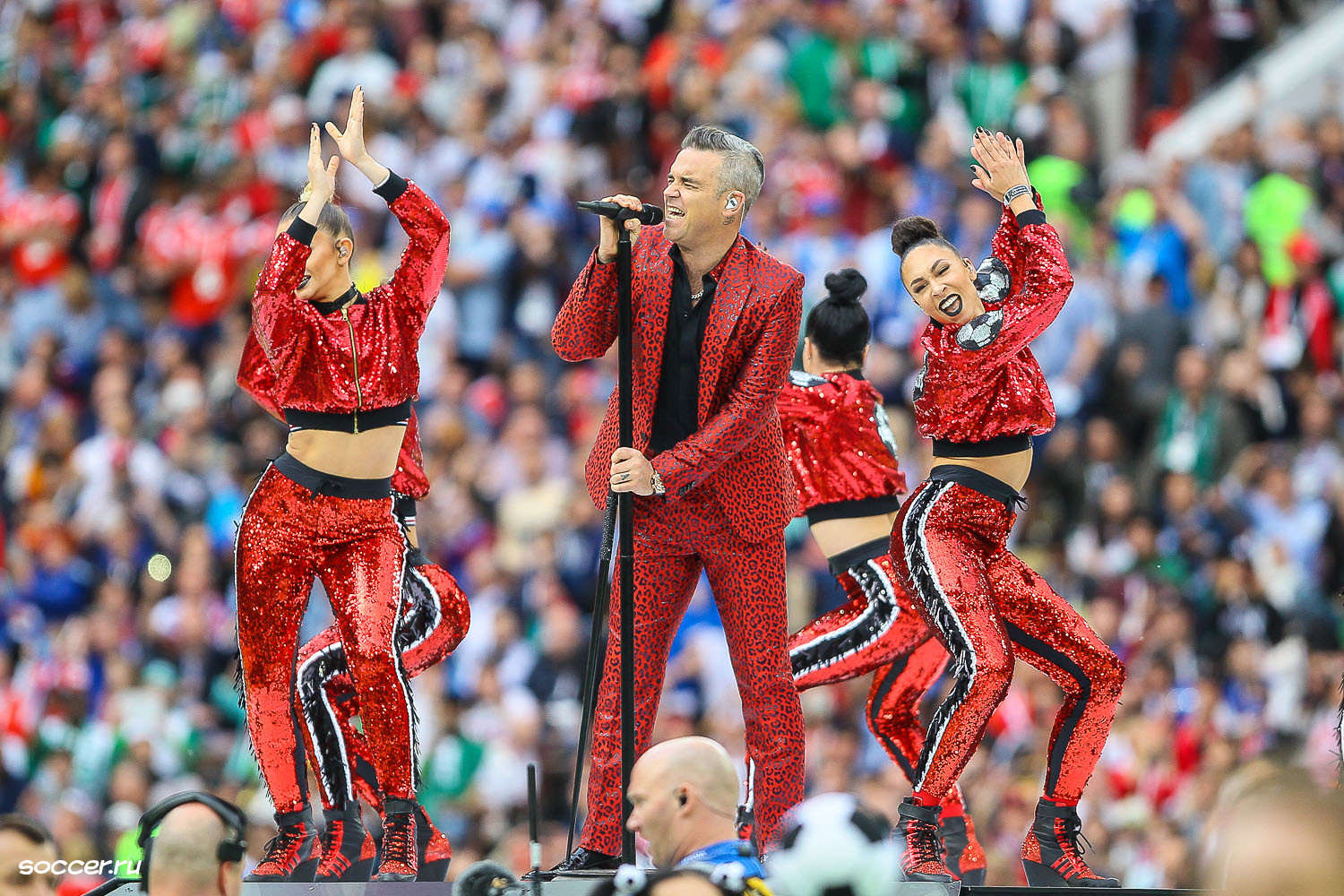
Williams performing at the 2018 FIFA World Cup opening ceremony in Moscow, Russia, 14 June 2018

On 14 June 2018, Williams performed at the 2018 FIFA World Cup opening ceremony held at the Luzhniki Stadium in Moscow, Russia. Williams sang "Let Me Entertain You" and "Feel" before he performed a duet of "Angels" with Russian soprano Aida Garifullina. Williams then performed an encore with "Rock DJ", during which he gave the finger. Fox in the US apologised for the incident which they had broadcast live. The incident was not shown on ITV in the UK who had cut away prior to the encore. Williams appeared on This Morning on 19 June and explained what happened, "It was one minute to kick off, I was under a lot of pressure, because there was one minute left and I didn't know how I was going to do half a minute, so I just did a one-minute countdown [using his middle finger]." Asked by presenter Phillip Schofield whether he regrets it, he said: "Yeah, of course, yeah. I cannot trust me. I don't know what I'm going to do at any time. There's no, sort of, plan. The plan was, sing in key, don't fall over. That was the plan and 99% of the plan, I pulled off." When asked did the idea just enter his head he responded, "Nothing actually pops into my head. There's a block between me and sense... then something happens and then five minutes later, I'm like, 'Did I? Yeah, I did, didn't I?".

On 17 July 2018, Williams along with his wife, and One Direction star Louis Tomlinson, were announced as the new judges on the fifteenth series of The X Factor in the UK, joining Simon Cowell and replacing Louis Walsh, Sharon Osbourne and Nicole Scherzinger.

=== 2019–2023: The Christmas Present and XXV ===
On 22 November, Williams released his first Christmas album, The Christmas Present, with guest appearances from boxer Tyson Fury, Rod Stewart, Jamie Cullum, Helene Fischer and Bryan Adams. It debuted at number two on the UK Charts behind Coldplay's Everyday Life. The album sold over 67,000 copies, matching The Heavy Entertainment Show. Williams also sold over 10,000 cassettes in seven days, the most in two decades. The following week saw Williams' album go to number one in the UK, outselling the nearest competitor, Rod Stewart, by 5,000 copies. This was Williams' 13th UK number-one album, tying Elvis Presley for the most UK number-one albums. Williams released the promotional single "Hey Tiger" in December 2019, for the new version of The Tiger Who Came to Tea.

On 25 February 2022, it was revealed that Williams had teamed up with his regular collaborators Tim Metcalfe and Flynn Francis to record the trance track "Sway" under the new alias 'Lufthaus'. In April 2022, The Guardian wrote that while Williams "remains a big draw", he was no longer guaranteed hits and was "now more likely to be playlisted on Smooth Radio than BBC Radio 1". Williams said he was working on more experimental music, which he likened to David Bowie and Lou Reed, but said: "Do I unashamedly want to still be one of the biggest artists in the world? Yeah, I do... I've had an interesting first half of my life. I'd like an interesting second half, too." In May 2022, Williams performed at the Rod Laver Arena in Melbourne, Australia, during the filming of his Better Man biopic which was produced at Docklands Studios Melbourne.

On 7 June 2022, Williams announced that his tenth compilation album, XXV, would be released on 9 September 2022. It will feature new, reimagined versions of his hit songs, plus new material. On the same day as this announcement, Williams released "Angels XXV", a reworked version of "Angels". On 10 June 2022, "Angels (XXV)" reached number 92 on the UK Official Singles Sales Chart, rising to 74 a week later. On 5 August 2022, Williams released the single "Lost", also taken from XXV. XXV was released on 9 September 2022 and debuted a week later at number 1 on the UK Official Albums Chart. In doing so, Williams broke all previous Official Chart records with his fourteenth solo number one album. On 24 September 2022, Williams performed at the 2022 AFL Grand Final held at the Melbourne Cricket Ground in Melbourne, Australia. Williams sang "Let Me Entertain You", "Rock DJ", "Lost" and "Feel" before he performed "Angels" which Williams dedicated to Australian cricketer Shane Warne, who had died in March 2022. Williams then covered John Farnham's "You're the Voice" stating "The next song is the unofficial national anthem of Australia! Let's all send our love to John and his family". Just two days prior on 22 September 2022, John Farnham had released a statement outlining that he was to undergo immediate surgery after being diagnosed with cancer. Williams then performed "Kids" with Australian singer Delta Goodrem.

On 7 October 2022, Lufthaus released the single "Soul Seekers". Williams' XXV tour started on 9 October 2022 in The O2 Arena, supported by Lufthaus. In November 2022, Williams performed in Qatar as part of the country's FIFA World Cup 2022 celebrations. His appearance attracted criticism due to Qatar's human rights abuses and strict LGBT laws. After the criticism, Williams stated, "I don't condone any abuses of human rights anywhere [...] if we're not condoning human rights abuses anywhere, then it would be the shortest tour the world has ever known: I wouldn't even be able to perform in my own kitchen [...] Anybody leaving messages saying 'no to Qatar' are doing so on Chinese technology [...] the hypocrisy there is that if we take that case in this place, we need to apply that unilaterally to the world. Then if we apply that unilaterally to the world, nobody can go anywhere."

On 5 May 2023, Williams was featured on the bilingual single "Une Tahitienne á Paris" by the French singer Mareva Galanter. On 21 August 2023, Williams was featured with a cameo performance on the single "Punk's Dead", by the English duo Soft Play. Lufthaus' debut album, "Visions, Volume 1" was released on 6 October 2023. The single "Immortal", featuring Sophie Ellis-Bextor, was released the day before.

=== 2024–present: Better Man and Britpop ===
On 2 May 2024, Williams was featured on the duet version of Lucy Spraggan's 2020 single "Sober". In September 2024, he featured on the track "Danny" with the Israeli singer Noga Erez on her album, The Vandalist. The pair previously performed together at his June 2023 concert in Tel Aviv.

In August 2024, Better Man, a musical biopic about Williams' life, opened to acclaim at the Telluride Film Festival. It was screened at the Toronto International Film Festival on 10 September 2024, and made its theatrical premiere on 26 December 2024 in Australia by Roadshow Films and in the United Kingdom by Entertainment Film Distributors. It had a limited theatrical release by Paramount Pictures in the United States on 25 December, before a wider release set for 10 January 2025. Better Man received a record-breaking 16 nominations at the 2025 AACTA Awards, winning in nine categories, including Best Film. It was a box-office failure, and performed particularly poorly in the US, where Williams is less known.

On 29 November 2024, Williams released the first single from the Better Man soundtrack, "Forbidden Road"; it reached number 20 on the UK Singles Downloads Chart one week later. It was nominated for Best Original Song at the 82nd Golden Globe Awards and the 14th AACTA Awards. It was initially shortlisted for the Academy Award for Best Original Song at the 97th Academy Awards but was disqualified a few days later after it was found it incorporated material from another song, "I Got A Name", as performed by Jim Croce. Williams was a headline performer for Australia's nationally broadcast New Year's Eve concert, screened annually on the ABC from in front of the Sydney Opera House. A portion of his performance from Sydney also appeared in Dick Clark's New Year's Rockin' Eve in the United States broadcast, hosted by Ryan Seacrest. On 3 January 2025, the soundtrack album to Better Man debuted at number 1 on the UK Albums Downloads Chart, and at number 4 on the UK Soundtrack Albums Chart; on 24 January 2025, after the album was released on CD, it debuted at number 1 on the main UK Albums Chart.

In May 2025, an exhibition of Williams' artwork opened in London. The Guardian gave it one out of five, saying it comprised "line drawings filled with therapy speak, greeting-card banter and meaningless affirmations". On 21 May 2025, he announced the release of his upcoming thirteenth studio album, Britpop; on the same day, he released the album's lead single, "Rocket", which features Tony Iommi. On August 21, 2025, Williams released the single "Human", which features Mexican sibling pop-duo Jesse & Joy.

In October 2025, Williams' Istanbul concert was cancelled over his alleged support for Israel, after social media users accused him of being a Zionist. Williams has not publicly commented on the Gaza war. He released Britpop 's fourth single, "Pretty Face", on 15 October 2025; the single peaked at number 14 on the UK Singles Downloads Chart, becoming the album's best performing single.

With an original release date set for 6 February 2026, Williams released Britpop three weeks early, surprise-releasing the standard version of the album on digital-download and streaming sites on 16 January 2026. Britpop garnered good reviews from critics. Britpop debuted at number one on the UK Albums Chart on 23 January 2026, becoming Williams' sixteenth solo number one album. In achieving this, he surpassed the Beatles' previous record of fifteen UK number one albums. The album saw commercial success outside of the United Kingdom, debuting at number three on the German album chart, number 15 on the Irish Albums Chart, and reaching the Top 40 in Australia, Austria, Switzerland and the Netherlands. On 18 September 2026, Williams' collaboration with Ukrainian DJ Miss Monique was released as a single; an official visualiser, directed by Charlie Lightening, was released the day before. The duo premiered the track in August 2026 during Carl Cox's DJ set in Ibiza.

== Other projects ==
=== Collaborations ===
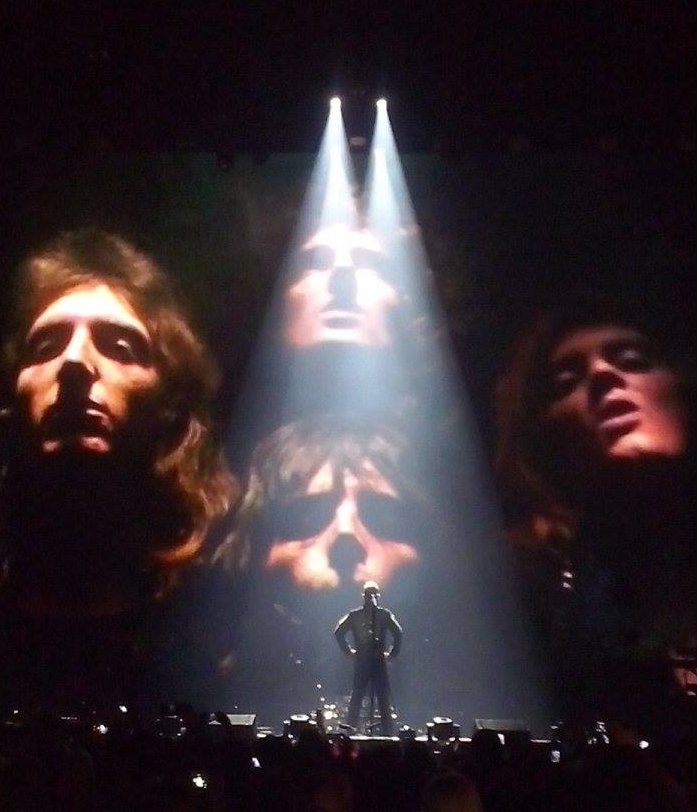
Williams on stage in Poland in 2015 performing "Bohemian Rhapsody". He collaborated with Queen in recording "We Are the Champions" for the 2001 film A Knight's Tale.

Robbie Williams collaborated with Australian pop star Kylie Minogue on the song "Kids". The single peaked at number 2 on the UK Singles Chart in 2000. Williams also collaborated with Australian film star Nicole Kidman on a cover of Frank and Nancy Sinatra's "Somethin' Stupid". The single reached number 1 on the UK Singles Chart in 2001. His single "No Regrets" featured Neil Tennant, and Neil Hannon on backing vocals. In 2001, Williams recorded "We Are the Champions" with Queen for the 2001 medieval adventure film A Knight's Tale.

In 2002, Williams appeared on the track "My Culture" on the 1 Giant Leap album, alongside rapper Maxi Jazz (which features lyrics from the hidden track "Hello Sir" from Life thru a Lens). Williams also features on a double CD titled Concrete which was released on the same day as Rudebox. The CD features a concert recorded for the BBC featuring the Pet Shop Boys and Williams singing their classic hit "Jealousy". Their joint effort, "She's Madonna", was released as a single in March 2007. On 13 August 2007, a Dean Martin duets album was released, on which Williams sings "Please Don't Talk About Me When I'm Gone".

In 2010, he announced the release of "Shame", a duet with Take That lead singer songwriter Gary Barlow, as the first single from his greatest hits collection, In and Out of Consciousness: The Greatest Hits 1990–2010, which was certified silver in the UK and charted in 19 countries worldwide. In 2010, Williams and comedian/actor Russell Brand along with Frank Skinner, David Baddiel and singer-songwriter Ian Broudie (of the Lightning Seeds), under the name "the Squad", recorded a new version of "Three Lions", the England football team's song, for the 2010 FIFA World Cup. In 2012, Williams recorded a duet with Mexican recording artist Thalía for the Spanish song "Te quiero dijiste (Muñequita linda)", included on her album Habítame Siempre. In 2014, he collaborated with Swedish DJ and record producer Avicii, lending his vocals to "The Days".

In 2019, he collaborated with British comedian Jimmy Carr, co-writing the lyrics for "Live in Las Vegas" – the opening song of Williams's residency at the Wynn Las Vegas. A studio version of the song has been recorded; excerpts of which have been used in promotional material for the show, but the song has not been officially released nor made available for download.

=== Other work ===
In 2005 Williams provided the voice of Dougal in the film adaption of The Magic Roundabout. On 26 August 2010, it was announced Williams would become a guest vocal coach on the ninth series of German reality television show Popstars: Girls forever to teach candidates for a girl group.

On 20 September 2010, Williams released his second book called You Know Me in collaboration with Chris Heath. The book features a collection of photographs of Williams from the past 20 years of his career and discussion of them by Williams as transcribed by Heath. Williams launched a radio show titled Radio Rudebox on 6 October 2011 where he played music and interviewed Gary Barlow.

In 2011, Williams announced he was working with entrepreneur Peter Jones in developing a clothing line called Farrell in honour of his grandfather Jack Farrell. Although the business had filed for bankruptcy, it was relaunched in 2014 with support of clothing company Primark.

=== Video games ===
Williams recorded the song "It's Only Us" as the theme for the FIFA video game FIFA 2000. As part of the agreement to license the track EA Sports included Port Vale, the football club Williams supports, in the game, despite only being in the third tier of the English football league system.

Williams features in his own karaoke video game, We Sing Robbie Williams, which was released on 12 November 2010 by Nordic Games Publishing AB.

=== Football ===
In 2005, Williams founded a football team called Los Angeles Vale F.C. Williams formed the club with other celebrity friends after building his own soccer pitch at his home in Los Angeles. The club was named after Williams' hometown club, Port Vale, and its logo was very similar. The club was disbanded in 2007, reportedly after Williams discovered two players had swindled him out of £200,000.

In January 2024, Williams was named president of Port Vale Football Club in Stoke-on-Trent. He sponsored the home and away shirts from the 2026–27 season.

=== Musical theatre ===
In 2018, it was announced that Williams and Guy Chambers would write the music and lyrics, with a book by Mark Ravenhill for the stage musical adaptation of David Walliams' children's book The Boy in the Dress for the Royal Shakespeare Company, directed by Gregory Doran. The musical opened in November 2019 at the Royal Shakespeare Theatre, Stratford-upon-Avon where it ran for an 18-week season, earning rave reviews from the critics and audiences. The musical had been planned to transfer to London's West End in autumn 2020, however due to the COVID-19 pandemic plans were postponed.

== Influences ==
During his childhood, Williams was influenced by swing musicians such as Frank Sinatra, Dean Martin, and Sammy Davis Jr. The first records he listened to were released by Nat King Cole, Sarah Vaughan, Ella Fitzgerald and Cole Porter, which belonged to his mother. At the age of 10, he got into hip hop and started collecting electro albums; "" '

"It's his self-deprecating sense of humour — in person and in his lyrics — that helps explain his wide appeal in Australia. Perhaps only Pink and Ed Sheeran have such a wide mix of demographics at their concerts; that's why Williams will play to nearly 60,000 people in Victoria alone."

— Cameron Adams on the appeal of Williams.

"Two of his biggest hits, 'Come Undone' and 'Feel,' were both exercises in melodic self loathing. It felt like a public airing of very private pain."

— Robbie Williams, O2 London, review, The Telegraph.

At the age of 10, he got into hip-hop and started collecting electro and when he started his solo career in the '90s, he was influenced by Britpop bands such as Oasis, Blur and Pulp.

As a singer, his influences include George Michael, Tom Jones, Elvis Presley and Bono. He worked with Jones several times throughout his career: They performed together at the Brit Awards in 1998; the following year, they recorded a cover of the song "Are You Gonna Go My Way" for Jones' album Reload; and in 2012, Williams and Jones worked together again on the song "On My Own", b-side of his single "Different".

Williams also feels great admiration for Freddie Mercury and Queen. In 2001, Williams, Brian May and Roger Taylor released a new version of "We Are the Champions" for the movie A Knight's Tale. He also revealed that he was once asked to be the new frontman of Queen, but that he turned down the offer because of his "very low self-esteem". He said: "I just thought I'd save them the audacity of me even trying to step on a stage and be in the same echelon as Freddie Mercury. Because he, to me, is angelic. He's godlike. It was just too scary."

Williams has revealed that he does the "Elvis Prayer" before going on stage at every concert. In 2000, he got a tattoo of the phrase "Elvis Grant Me Serenity" and he also played as an Elvis impersonator in the music video for his song "Advertising Space" (2005).

Speaking to BBC Radio 2 in February 2021, Williams cited Ian Dury as his biggest inspiration as a lyricist. He sings on "You're the Why", the final track of the posthumously released album Ten More Turnips from the Tip (2002).

== Legacy ==
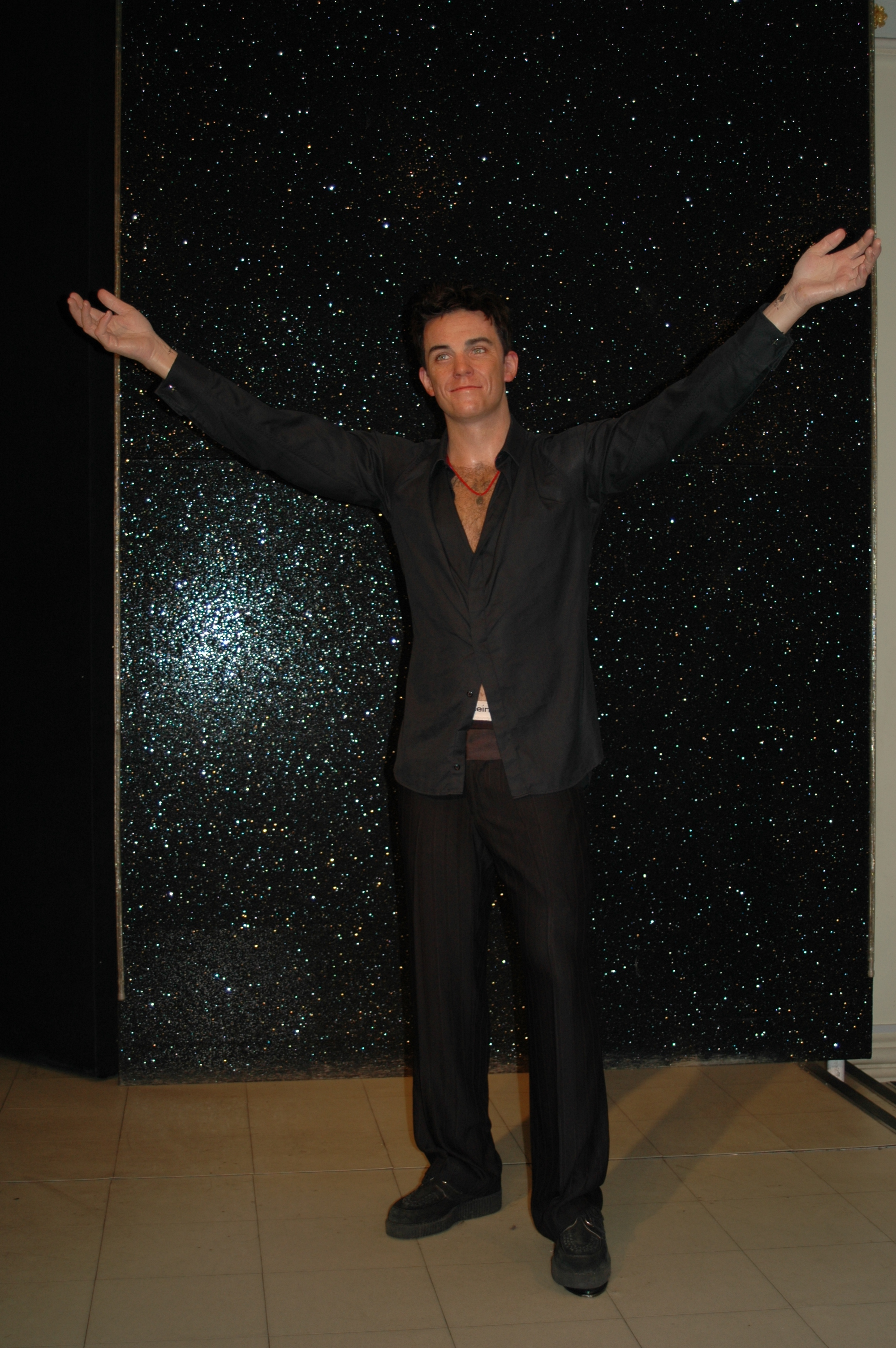
Wax statue of Williams at Madame Tussauds in London

By 2008, Williams had sold more albums in the UK than any other British solo artist in history. His record sales stand at between 75 million and 80 million worldwide, making him one of the best-selling artists of all time. Williams was entered in The Guinness Book of World Records when, after he announced his World Tour for 2006, 1.6 million tickets were sold in one day.

Caroline Sullivan of The Guardian wrote that Williams is "a perfect meeting of ego, self-deprecation and hits", adding "there really is nobody else, in pop music anyway, who combines monumental hamminess and bone-deep vulnerability quite so effectively."

Williams has won significantly more Brit Awards than any other artist, a record eighteen—Best British Male Artist four times, two awards for Outstanding Contribution to Music and the 2017 Brits Icon for his "lasting impact on British culture", and eight German ECHO awards. In 2004, he was inducted into the UK Music Hall of Fame, after being voted as the Greatest artist of the 1990s. He appeared in the 2009 edition of the Guinness Book of World Records when his sell-out show at the BBC Electric Proms at London's Roundhouse was screened by more than 250 cinemas across 23 countries to set a new record for the most simultaneous cinematic screenings of a live concert. Williams appears in the list of the all-time Top 100 biggest selling albums in the UK six times–with four albums in the top 60.

In 2005, the British public voted "Angels" the song they would most like played at their funeral. In October 2009, it was announced that he would receive the Outstanding Contribution to British Music award at the 2010 Brit Awards. In September 2010, Williams switched on the Blackpool illuminations, stating that it was one of the greatest honours he had achieved. In October, Media Control named Williams the most successful album-artist of the millennium due to the fact that he had spent No. 1 on the German Albums Chart for 38 weeks since 2000. He also reached that chart's Top Ten 135 times. He was ranked at No. 11 the greatest frontman of all time in a reader poll by Q.

=== Influence on other artists ===
Contemporary artists have expressed their admiration for Williams and cited him as one of their influences. The English rapper Example admitted his obsession with Williams and how he had been inspired by Williams' performances when he was younger. He described his own performance on stage as "a combination of rap, rock and Robbie Williams".

Ed Sheeran, in an interview with El Hormiguero, revealed that the first album he ever bought was Life Thru a Lens. Olly Murs paid tribute to Williams' "Angels" music video in the music video for his single "Hand on Heart". One of Louis Tomlinson's earliest influences was Williams, of whom he declared he is a big fan.

== Personal life ==
=== Residence ===
In 2006, Williams emigrated to Los Angeles. He briefly moved back to the UK in 2009 when he bought an £8.5 million mansion in Compton Bassett, but sold the property a year later to move back to Los Angeles.

In 2016, he moved into Woodland House, a £17 million mansion in the Kensington area of London. His next-door neighbour there is Led Zeppelin guitarist Jimmy Page, who has lived in The Tower House since 1972. In 2018, Page delayed Williams' plans for an underground swimming pool, stating that construction work would damage The Tower House. In 2017, he sold his mansion in Beverly Hills to DJ Khaled for $9.9 million.

=== Health issues ===
Williams has suffered from mental illness, obesity, self-esteem issues, alcoholism, and substance abuse. He has discussed how his friend Elton John booked him into a clinic to cope with his drug use that emerged from the depression he was experiencing while still in Take That.

Williams revealed in 2011 he had been experiencing lethargy caused by a type of hormone imbalance called andropause for a number of years, and thought at first it was a return of his depression. In a June 2020 interview with Weight Watchers Magazine, he revealed that he had developed an addiction to online golf games. Williams also has dyslexia, dyscalculia, ADHD, autism and Tourette syndrome.

=== Interests ===
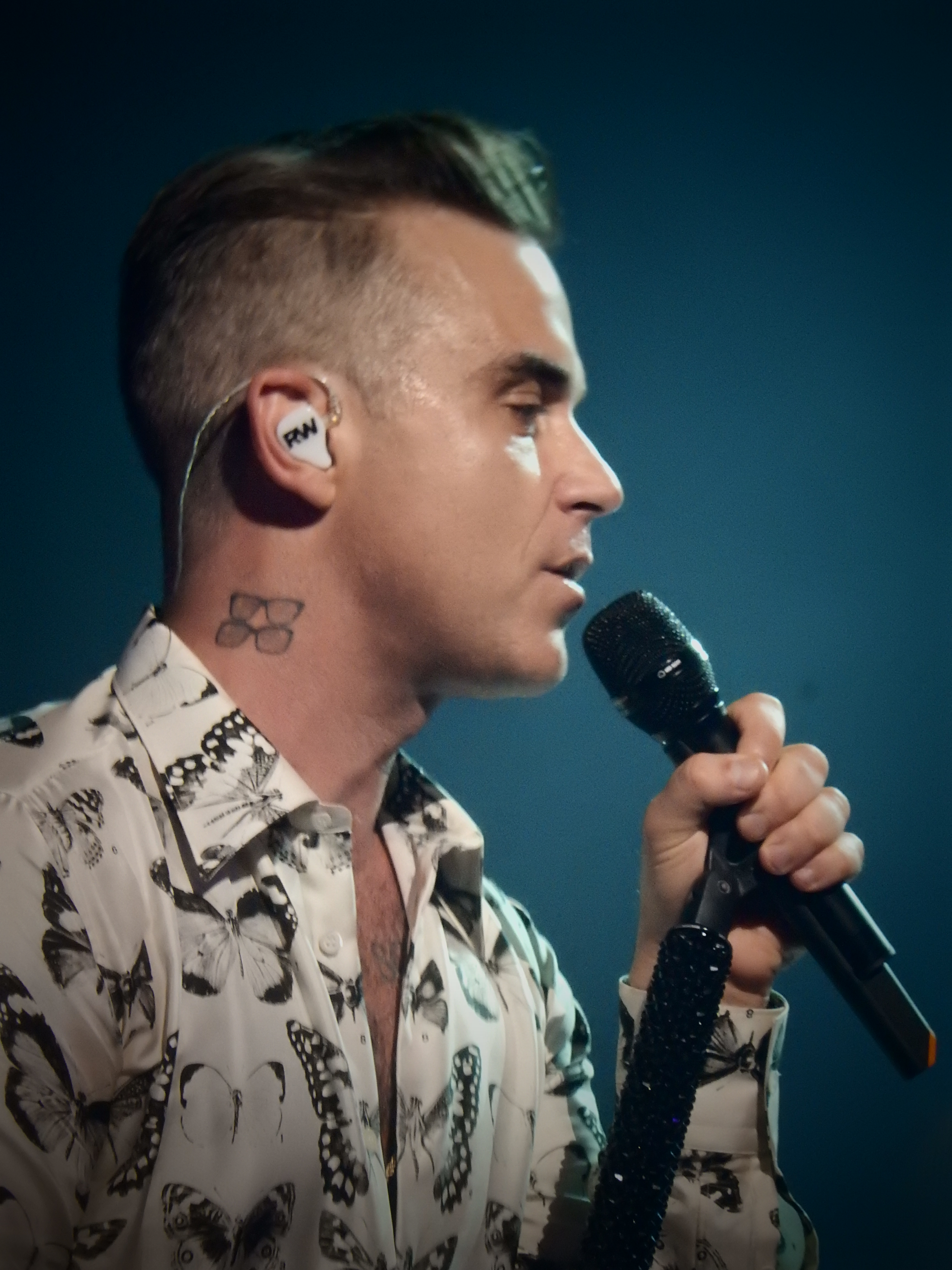
One of Williams' tattoos, the spectacles logo of The Two Ronnies, visible on his neck

Williams has a keen interest in UFOs and related paranormal phenomena, and researched the subject during his 2007–2008 sabbatical. He participated in a documentary for BBC Radio 4 with Jon Ronson about the paranormal. The documentary followed them to a UFO convention in Nevada, during which Williams linked his obsession in the paranormal with the desire to understand his childhood fears of his mother's belief in "the world's mysteries, elves, demons, [and] witchcraft".

Williams featured in a 2018 TV documentary Hunt for the Skinwalker by Jeremy Corbell, and revealed that his partner Ayda Field dissuaded him from buying the Skinwalker Ranch when it became for sale.

Williams became an ordained minister with the Universal Ministries to officiate the wedding of friends.

Williams has a number of tattoos, including:

- an Ace of Spades, commemorating heavy metal band Motörhead.
- a fez, common headwear of comedian Tommy Cooper.
- the logo of The Saint, tribute to Roger Moore who played the titular character on the TV show.
- the spectacles logo of The Two Ronnies, the comedy sketch show of the TV double act of Ronnie Barker and Ronnie Corbett.
- the "skip dance" pose of Morecambe and Wise, another TV comic double act (Eric Morecambe and Ernie Wise).
- a Stafford knot, a symbol of his home county Staffordshire.
- the logo of his former group Take That.
- the coat of arms of Burslem, the town in Stoke-on-Trent where he grew up.
- the notes and words of the first line of the chorus of the Beatles' song "All You Need Is Love" on his lower back.
- "Simha", which means "happy occasion" in Hebrew.
- his four children's date of births.
- a Māori tribal prayer of protection.

Williams became a fan of his hometown football team Port Vale FC as a child after his father became the licensee of the team's social club. He has played in a testimonial match for club legend Neil Aspin and helped to design the playing strip for the 2020–21 season. He is also a supporter of the Carlton Football Club in the Australian Football League.

In 2020, Williams received backlash for defending the widely debunked Pizzagate conspiracy theory.

At a February 2025 auction of memorabilia and personal items, belonging to Eric Morecambe, long-time fan Williams bought his distinctive imitation tortoiseshell Metzler spectacles and pipe for £20,000, much more than their £2,000 to £4,000 estimate.

=== Relationships and fatherhood ===
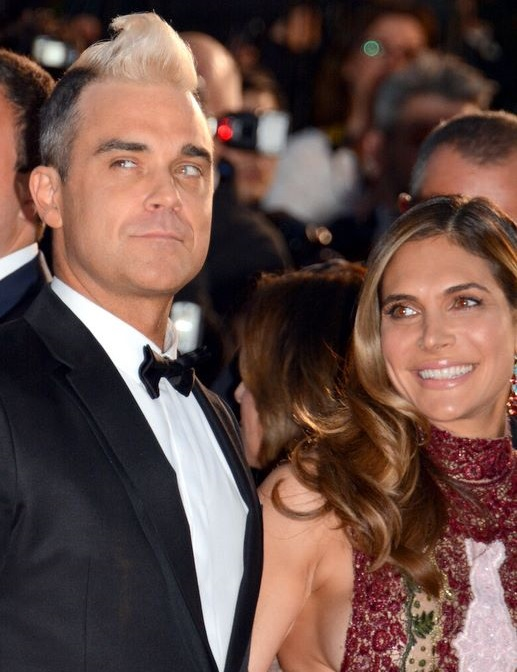
Williams and Ayda Field in 2015

In 1997, Williams was in a month-long relationship with Spice Girls singer Melanie Chisholm; also in 2000, Williams was in a short-term relationship with Geri Halliwell, another member of Spice Girls.

In December 1997, he met All Saints singer Nicole Appleton while filming Top of the Pops. The following year, they started an on-and-off relationship, and at one point got engaged. In an autobiography she co-authored with her sister Natalie titled Together, Appleton revealed that she terminated the pregnancy of her and Williams' baby after pressure from her record company, causing an immense emotional strain on their relationship. They broke up by 1999. Williams would state in later interviews that he was ashamed of his actions during their relationship, citing himself as a "fucking awful boyfriend" [to Appleton]. Their relationship was portrayed heavily in the 2024 biopic Better Man.

In May 2006, Williams started dating American actress Ayda Field. She was featured in the UFO documentary that Williams did for BBC Radio 4 and took part in a field investigation he did in Trout Lake, Washington, in 2008. Williams and Field wed at his home in Mulholland Estates in Beverly Hills on 7 August 2010. They have four children; two daughters and two sons. Williams's wife is Ashkenazi Jewish. Williams said in June 2023 that he and his wife are raising their children in accordance with Jewish customs.

Williams has spoken of confusion regarding past comments he has made about his sexuality. He also said he is "sad" about the related tabloid conjecture, yet does not fear being perceived as homosexual: "You want to be an ally while at the same time protecting your own authenticity."

=== Wealth ===
In the 2011 Sunday Times Rich List of wealthiest people in the British music industry, his wealth was estimated at £90 million. Williams is a lifelong supporter of football club Port Vale, based in his home town of Stoke-on-Trent, and in February 2006 he bought £240,000 worth of shares in the club, making him the largest shareholder. However, the club entered administration on 9 March 2012, and as a result Williams lost all of his shares in the club and received only a fraction of his original investment back.

=== Charity ===
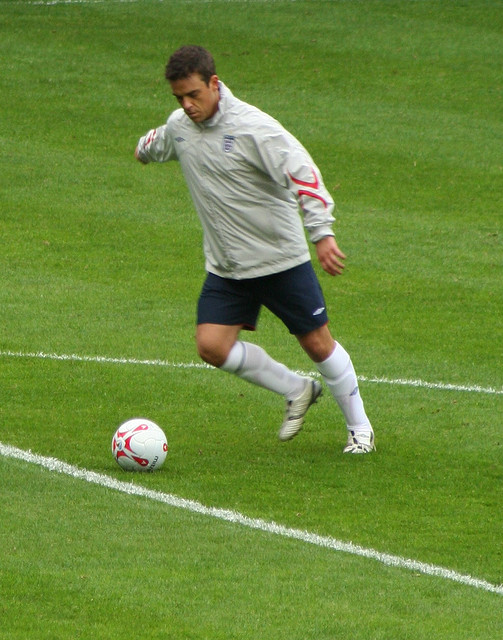
Williams warming up for the 2006 edition of Soccer Aid

Williams has set up a charity in his home town of Stoke-on-Trent entitled Give It Sum, its goal being to "improve local conditions and strengthen community life by giving money to those who are disadvantaged."

Williams, with the help of friend Jonathan Wilkes, has organised charity football matches called Soccer Aid to raise money for UNICEF UK. A mixture of non-football celebrities and professional football players have played Soccer Aid matches in 2006, 2008, 2010, 2012, 2014, 2016, 2018, 2019, 2020, 2021, 2022, and 2023 at Old Trafford, and Etihad Stadium in Manchester and Wembley Stadium, Stamford Bridge, and the London Stadium in London.

Williams has been the Patron of the children's charity the Donna Louise Trust, based in Stoke-on-Trent, since 2002. The charity offers respite and palliative care to terminally ill and life-limited children who are not expected to live past the age of 16.

== Awards and nominations ==
Williams has won various awards, with some of his more recognised accolades being the Brit Awards. He has won a record eighteen Brit Awards, which also include the Brits he won with Take That, making him the most successful artist in the history of the awards. He has also won 8 Echo Awards from the German music industry.

== Concerts ==
=== Solo ===
- Show Off Must Go On Tour (1997)
- Ego Has Landed Tour (1998)
- One More for the Rogue Tour (1998–99)
- 1999 Tour (1999) (Man, The Myth, The Tax Bill [a.k.a. Born To Be Mild], A Few Dollars More..., Get Your Coat Baby, You've Pulled!)
- The Sermon on the Mount Tour (2000–01)
- Weddings, Barmitzvahs & Stadiums Tour (2001)
- 2003 Tour (2003) (Weekends of Mass Distraction, Cock of Justice, Aussie Typo)
- Close Encounters Tour (2006)
- Take the Crown Stadium Tour (2013)
- Swings Both Ways Live (2014)
- Let Me Entertain You Tour (2015)
- The Heavy Entertainment Show Tour (2017–18)
- XXV Tour (2022–23)
- Britpop Tour (2025–26)

=== Take That ===
- Party Tour (1992–93)
- Everything Changes Tour (1993–94)
- Pops Tour (1994–95)
- Progress Live (2011)

=== Residencies ===
- Robbie Williams Live in Las Vegas (2019)

== Robbie Williams band ==
Along the tours, Robbie Williams had various members in his band.

Current members

- Robbie Williams – lead vocals, guitar, tambourine (1997–present)
- Gary Nuttall – lead guitar, backing vocals (1997–present)
- Jeremy Meehan – bass guitar, backing vocals (2004–present)
- Karl Brazil – drums (2009–present)
- Tom Longworth – rhythm guitar, backing vocals (2012–present)
- Owen Parker – keyboard (2022–present)
- Denosh Bennett – backing vocals (2012–present)
- Sara-Jane Skeete – backing vocals (2012–present)
- Nayanna Holley – backing vocals (2012–present)

Brass (Atlantic Horns)

- Ben Edwards – trumpet, flugelhorn, percussion (2012–present)
- Mike Kearsey – trombones, sousaphone, keyboards, percussion (2012–present)
- Mark Brown – saxophones, bass clarinet, acoustic guitar, keyboards, backing vocals (2012–present)

Former members

- Guy Chambers – keyboard, guitar, backing vocals (1997–2002; 2012–2022)
- Fil Eisler – bass, guitar, backing vocals (1997–2001)
- Andy Wallace – keyboard, tambourine (1997–1998; 2002)
- Steve "Smiley" Barnard – drums (1997)
- Chris Sharrock – drums (1998–2008)
- Alex Dickson – guitar (1998–2000)
- Claire Worrall – keyboard, guitar, backing vocals (1998–2007)
- Chris White – saxophone, flute (1999–2003)
- Paul Spong – saxophone, flute (1999–2003)
- Dave Bishop – trombone, flute (1999–2003)
- Neil Sidwell – trombone, flute (1999–2003)
- Simon Gardner – trumpet (1999–2003)
- Yolande Charles – bass, backing vocals (2000–2003)
- Tessa Niles – backing vocals (2000–2003)
- Katie Kissoon – backing vocals (2000–2003)
- Neil Taylor – guitar, backing vocals (2002–2012)
- Max Beesley – piano, percussion (2002–2006)
- Stephen Duffy – guitar (2004–2006)
- Paul Beard – keyboard (2009–2012)

== Discography ==
Studio albums as a solo artist

- Life thru a Lens (1997)
- I've Been Expecting You (1998)
- Sing When You're Winning (2000)
- Swing When You're Winning (2001)
- Escapology (2002)
- Intensive Care (2005)
- Rudebox (2006)
- Reality Killed the Video Star (2009)
- Take the Crown (2012)
- Swings Both Ways (2013)
- The Heavy Entertainment Show (2016)
- The Christmas Present (2019)
- Britpop (2026)

See also

- Under the Radar Vol. 1 (2014)
- Under the Radar Vol. 2 (2017)
- Under the Radar Vol. 3 (2019)

Studio albums with Take That

- Take That & Party (1992)
- Everything Changes (1993)
- Nobody Else (1995)
- Progress (2010)

Studio albums with Lufthaus

- Visions, Vol. 1 (2023)
