= Britpop Tour =

2025–2026 concert tour by Robbie Williams

- Tour by Robbie Williams
- Promotional poster
- Location: Africa; Asia; Europe; North America; Oceania; South America
- Associated album: Britpop
- Start date: 31 May 2025
- End date: 12 December 2026
- No. of shows: 75
- Supporting acts: The Lottery Winners; Rag 'N' Bone Man; Davina Michelle; Dara; G Flip; Drax Project; Pedropiedra
- Website: robbiewilliams.com/pages/live

Robbie Williams concert chronology
- XXV Tour (2022–2023); Britpop Tour (2025–2026)

The Britpop Tour is the fourteenth concert tour by the English singer and songwriter Robbie Williams, in support of his thirteenth studio album, Britpop (2026). The tour began in Edinburgh, Scotland on 31 May 2025, and is scheduled to conclude in Lima, Peru on 12 December 2026.

Britpop saw Williams' return to stadiums, as his previous tours, XXV (2022–2023), and The Heavy Entertainment Show (2017–2018) took place mostly in indoor arenas. The initial European leg of the tour was first announced on 11 November 2024, with additional dates revealed for the leg later in 2024 and 2025. The Latin American leg of the tour was revealed on 23 February 2026, after Williams previously teased that one would be happening later. On 17 March 2026, Williams announced an Australian & New Zealand leg of the tour during an interview on Australian TV Program A Current Affair.

The name of the tour was officially announced as Britpop Tour on 21 May 2025, being referred to as Robbie Williams Live 2025 beforehand, as the title of the album hadn't been announced yet.

== Set list ==
This set list was taken from the 7 August 2025 concert in Stockholm, Sweden. It does not represent all shows throughout the tour.

Main set

1. "Rocket"
2. "Let Me Entertain You"
3. "All My Life" / "Song 2" / "Seven Nation Army" / "Livin' on a Prayer"
4. "Monsoon"
5. "Rock DJ"
6. "Love My Life"
7. "Strong"
8. "The Road to Mandalay"
9. "Supreme"
10. "Tripping" / "Better Man" / "Sexed Up" / "Candy"
11. "Relight My Fire"
12. "Something Beautiful"
13. "Millennium"
14. "Theme from New York, New York"
15. "Spies"
16. "Kids"
17. "Highway to Hell" / "Good Times" / "Give It Away" / "Dancing Queen" / "The Winner Takes It All" / "Sweet Dreams (Are Made of This)" / "Young Hearts Run Free" / "Wonderwall" (Band introductions)
18. "She's the One"
19. "My Way"
  Encore
20. "Feel"
21. "Angels"

=== Special guests ===
- 31 May 2025 – Edinburgh: "Relight My Fire" with Michelle McManus
- 6 June 2025 – London: "Relight My Fire" with Lulu; "Keep On Movin'" with Five
- 7 June 2025 – London: "Relight My Fire" with Lulu; "Can't Touch This" with Lethal Bizzle, Scorcher and Wiley
- 10 June 2025 – Manchester: "Relight My Fire" with Lucy Spraggan
- 11 June 2025 – Manchester: "Relight My Fire" with Self Esteem
- 14 June 2025 – Bath: "Relight My Fire" with Olly Murs; "The One and Only" with Chesney Hawkes
- 19 June 2025 – Copenhagen: "Barbie Girl" with Aqua
- 22 & 23 June 2025 – Amsterdam: "Relight My Fire" with Davina Michelle
- 20 August 2025 – Newcastle: "Relight My Fire" with Perrie
- 23 August 2025 – Dublin: "Take Me Home, Country Roads" with Garron Noone
- 2 October 2025 – Athens: "Desire" with Laura Pausini

== Tour dates ==
List of 2025 concerts
Date (2025)	City	Country	Venue	Opening acts	Attendance	Revenue
31 May	Edinburgh	Scotland	Murrayfield Stadium	Rag'n'Bone Man; The Lottery Winners	61,180 / 61,180	$8,653,828
6 June	London	England	Emirates Stadium	Rag'n'Bone Man; The Lottery Winners	106,927 / 106,927	$16,685,017
7 June	London	England	Emirates Stadium	Rag'n'Bone Man; The Lottery Winners	106,927 / 106,927	$16,685,017
10 June	Manchester	England	Co-op Live	The Lottery Winners	33,076 / 33,076	$4,994,030
11 June	Manchester	England	Co-op Live	The Lottery Winners	33,076 / 33,076	$4,994,030
13 June	Bath	England	Royal Crescent	The Lottery Winners	30,000 / 30,000	$5,502,452
14 June	Bath	England	Royal Crescent	The Lottery Winners	30,000 / 30,000	$5,502,452
19 June	Copenhagen	Denmark	Parken	The Lottery Winners	47,853 / 47,853	$7,152,779
22 June	Amsterdam	Netherlands	Johan Cruijff ArenA	Davina Michelle	98,084 / 98,084	$12,732,296
23 June	Amsterdam	Netherlands	Johan Cruijff ArenA	Davina Michelle	98,084 / 98,084	$12,732,296
25 June	Gelsenkirchen	Germany	Veltins-Arena	The Lottery Winners	51,071 / 51,071	$8,298,721
28 June (Note: This show was part of TW Classic.)	Werchter	Belgium	Werchter Festivalpark	—N/a	—N/a	—N/a
30 June	Hanover	Germany	Heinz-von-Heiden-Arena	The Lottery Winners	41,996 / 41,996	$6,642,283
2 July	Nanterre (Note: Labelled as Paris in promotional material.)	France	Paris La Défense Arena	The Lottery Winners	30,772 / 36,731	$3,658,609
5 July	Cornellà de Llobregat (Note: Labelled as Barcelona in promotional material.)	Spain	RCDE Stadium	The Lottery Winners	26,857 / 34,274	$3,443,648
9 July	Leipzig	Germany	Red Bull Arena	The Lottery Winners	41,576 / 41,576	$6,729,213
12 July	Vienna	Austria	Ernst-Happel-Stadion	The Lottery Winners	53,687 / 53,687	$6,836,144
17 July	Trieste	Italy	Stadio Nereo Rocco	The Lottery Winners	26,638 / 28,850	$3,205,016
22 July	Berlin	Germany	Waldbühne	The Lottery Winners	39,423 / 44,000	$5,516,539
23 July (Note: The show at the Waldbühne in Berlin on 23 July was originally scheduled for 21 July, but was postponed to the 23rd due to severe weather conditions.)	Berlin	Germany	Waldbühne	The Lottery Winners	39,423 / 44,000	$5,516,539
26 July	Munich	Germany	Olympiastadion	The Lottery Winners	68,585 / 68,585	$9,660,033
1 August	Kaunas	Lithuania	Darius and Girėnas Stadium	The Lottery Winners	—	—
3 August	Riga	Latvia	Mežaparks Great Bandstand	The Lottery Winners	—	—
7 August	Stockholm	Sweden	Stockholm Olympic Stadium	The Lottery Winners	30,260 / 31,940	$3,482,940
10 August	Frankfurt	Germany	Deutsche Bank Park	The Lottery Winners	41,628 / 41,628	$7,994,524
13 August	Stavanger	Norway	Forus Travbane	The Lottery Winners	16,388 / 18,000	$2,732,852
16 August	Trondheim	Norway	Dahls Arena	The Lottery Winners	22,000 / 22,000	$3,572,854
20 August (Note: This show was part of Come Together Festival.)	Newcastle	England	Newcastle Town Moor	—N/a	—N/a	—N/a
23 August	Dublin	Ireland	Croke Park	The Lottery Winners	79,676 / 79,676	$10,536,365
4 September (Note: This show was part of Park Live Almaty.)	Almaty	Kazakhstan	Pervomayskie Ponds	—N/a	—N/a	—N/a
7 September	Prague	Czech Republic	O2 Arena	The Lottery Winners	13,123 / 13,123	$1,749,594
9 September	Kraków	Poland	Tauron Arena Kraków	The Lottery Winners	15,746 / 15,746	$1,895,937
12 September	Budapest	Hungary	MVM Dome	The Lottery Winners	17,989 / 17,989	$2,374,825
14 September	Klagenfurt	Austria	Wörthersee Stadion	The Lottery Winners	24,451 / 27,097	$3,188,541
17 September (Note: This show was part of Aftersun Festival.)	Floriana	Malta	Fosos Square	—N/a	—N/a	—N/a
20 September	Helsinki	Finland	Helsinki Olympic Stadium	The Lottery Winners	38,852 / 41,927	$4,690,357
28 September	Sofia	Bulgaria	Vasil Levski National Stadium	Dara; The Lottery Winners	—	—
2 October	Athens	Greece	Panathenaic Stadium	—N/a	—	—

List of 2026 concerts
Date (2026)	City	Country	Venue	Opening acts	Attendance	Revenue
5 June	Düsseldorf	Germany	Merkur Spiel-Arena	—	—	—
6 June	Düsseldorf	Germany	Merkur Spiel-Arena	—	—	—
13 June (Note: This show was part of Firenze Rocks.)	Florence	Italy	Visarno Arena	—N/a	—N/a	—N/a
27 June (Note: This show was part of Live Is Live.)	Antwerp	Belgium	Middenvijver Park	—N/a	—N/a	—N/a
30 June (Note: This show was part of the Icónica Santalucía series of concerts.)	Seville	Spain	Plaza de España	—	—	—
2 July (Note: This show was part of Jazzablanca.)	Casablanca	Morocco	Anfa Park	—N/a	—N/a	—N/a
6 July (Note: This show was part of the Luxexpo Open Air series of concerts.)	Luxembourg	Luxembourg	Luxexpo The Box	—	—	—
10 July (Note: This show was part of Bilbao BBK Live.)	Bilbao	Spain	Kobetamendi	—N/a	—N/a	—N/a
5 August (Note: This show was part of Smukfest.)	Skanderborg	Denmark	Skanderborg Dyrehave	—N/a	—N/a	—N/a
8 August (Note: This show was part of Lovestream Festival.)	Bratislava	Slovakia	Old Vajnory Airport	—N/a	—N/a	—N/a
9 August (Note: This show was part of the Big Art series of concerts.)	Arzachena (Note: Labelled as Porto Cervo in promotional material.)	Italy	Romazzino (Note: A Belmond hotel.)	—	—	—
15 August (Note: This show was part of Bittersweet Festival.)	Poznań	Poland	Citadel Park	—N/a	—N/a	—N/a
20 August (Note: This show was part of V and B Fest'.)	Château-Gontier-sur-Mayenne	France	Château de la Maroutière	—N/a	—N/a	—N/a
28 August (Note: This show was part of MEO Kalorama.)	Lisbon	Portugal	Bela Vista Park	—N/a	—N/a	—N/a
9 September	Zurich	Switzerland	Hallenstadion	—	—	—
10 September	Zurich	Switzerland	Hallenstadion	—	—	—
12 September	Lausanne	Switzerland	Vaudoise Aréna	—	—	—
20 September	Bogotá	Colombia	Movistar Arena	—	—	—
23 September	Lima	Peru	Arena 1 Park	—	—	—
27 September	Santiago	Chile	Estadio Bicentenario de La Florida	The Lottery Winners; Pedropiedra	—	—
1 October	Buenos Aires	Argentina	Movistar Arena	—	—	—
2 October	Buenos Aires	Argentina	Movistar Arena	—	—	—
4 October	Buenos Aires	Argentina	Movistar Arena	—	—	—
7 October	Mexico City	Mexico	Palacio de los Deportes	—	—	—
8 October	Mexico City	Mexico	Palacio de los Deportes	—	—	—
10 October (Note: This show was part of Festival Pulso GNP.)	El Marqués	Mexico	Autodromo de Querétaro	—N/a	—N/a	—N/a
13 October	São Paulo	Brazil	Nubank Parque	—	—	—
27 October (Note: This show was part of VidantaWorld series of concerts.)	Puerto Vallarta	Mexico	VidantaWorld Nuevo Nayarit	—	—	—
3 November (Note: This show was part of the 2026 Lexus Melbourne Cup)	Melbourne	Australia	Flemington Racecourse	—	—	—
7 November	Adelaide	Australia	Adelaide Oval	G Flip; The Lottery Winners	—	—
11 November	Melbourne	Australia	Marvel Stadium	G Flip; The Lottery Winners	—	—
14 November	Sydney	Australia	Accor Stadium	G Flip; The Lottery Winners	—	—
17 November	Newcastle	Australia	McDonald Jones Stadium	G Flip; The Lottery Winners	—	—
20 November	Brisbane	Australia	Suncorp Stadium	G Flip; The Lottery Winners	—	—
24 November	Auckland	New Zealand	Eden Park	Drax Project; The Lottery Winners	—	—
28 November	Christchurch	New Zealand	One New Zealand Stadium	Drax Project; The Lottery Winners	—	—
12 December	Lima	Peru	San Marcos Stadium	—	—	—

=== Cancelled dates ===
List of cancelled concerts, showing date, city, country, venue and reason
Date	City	Country	Venue	Reason	Ref.
7 October 2025	Istanbul	Turkey	Ataköy Marina	Security concerns	
24 September 2026	Lima	Peru	Arena 1 Park	Closure of venue	
