= Luke Millar =

New Zealand visual effects artist

- Occupation: Visual effects artist

Luke Millar is a New Zealand visual effects artist. He was nominated for an Academy Award in the category Best Visual Effects for the film Better Man.

== Selected filmography ==
- Better Man (2024; co-nominated with David Clayton, Keith Herft and Peter Stubbs)
