= Peter Stubbs (special effects artist) =

Australian special effects artist

- Occupation: Special effects artist

Peter Stubbs is an Australian special effects artist. He was nominated for an Academy Award in the category Best Visual Effects for the film Better Man.

== Selected filmography ==
- Better Man (2024; co-nominated with Luke Millar, David Clayton and Keith Herft)
