= Keith Herft =

Australian visual effects artist

- Occupation: Visual effects artist

Keith Herft is an Australian visual effects artist. He was nominated for an Academy Award in the category Best Visual Effects for the film Better Man.

== Selected filmography ==
- Better Man (2024; co-nominated with Luke Millar, David Clayton and Peter Stubbs)
