= Forbidden Road =

2024 song by Robbie Williams

Single by Robbie Williams

from the album Better Man (Original Motion Picture Soundtrack)
- Released: 22 November 2024
- Genre: Soft rock
- Length: 3:18
- Label: Columbia
- Songwriters: Robert Williams; Freddy Wexler; Sacha Skarbek
- Producers: Wexler; Dan Romer

Robbie Williams singles chronology
"Lost (XXV)" (2022)	"Forbidden Road" (2024)	"Rocket" (2025)

"Forbidden Road" is a song by English singer-songwriter Robbie Williams, released as the lead single from the soundtrack to Williams' biopic, Better Man (2024).

== Music video ==
An official lyric video was released on 22 November 2024.

== Chart performance ==
Following the single's release, "Forbidden Road" debuted and peaked at number 20 on the UK Singles Downloads Chart, and at number 26 on the UK Singles Sales Chart.

== Accolades ==
"Forbidden Road" was nominated for Best Original Song at the 82nd Golden Globe Awards. It was initially shortlisted for the Best Original Song at the 97th Academy Awards, but was disqualified due to the technical rules of the category on the grounds that "Forbidden Road" allegedly took the majority of "I Got a Name" by Charles Fox and Norman Gimbel and sung by Jim Croce, as the latter was not written specifically for the film.

== Charts ==
Chart performance for "Forbidden Road"
Chart (2024–2025)	Peak position
Belgium (Ultratop 50 Flanders)	40
Czech Republic Singles Digital (ČNS IFPI)	27
Iceland (Tónlistinn)	28
Slovakia Airplay (ČNS IFPI)	19
UK Singles Downloads (OCC)	20
UK Singles Sales (OCC)	26
