= Britpop (Robbie Williams album) =

Studio album by Robbie Williams
- Released: 16 January 2026
- Recorded: –
- Length: 38:13
- Label: Columbia
- Producers: Karl Brazil; Tom Longworth; Sam Miller; Owen Parker; Martin Terefe; Freddy Wexler

Robbie Williams chronology
Better Man (Original Motion Picture Soundtrack) (2024)	Britpop (2026)

Singles from Britpop
- 1. "Rocket" Released: 21 May 2025; 2. "Spies" Released: 18 July 2025; 3. "Human" Released: 21 August 2025; 4. "Pretty Face" Released: 15 October 2025; 5. "All My Life" Released: 16 January 2026

Britpop is the thirteenth studio album by English singer-songwriter Robbie Williams, and his first studio album since 2019's The Christmas Present. The album was released on 16 January 2026 by Columbia Records. It produced five singles: "Rocket" featuring former Black Sabbath guitarist Tony Iommi, "Spies", "Human" featuring Mexican pop duo Jesse & Joy, "Pretty Face" and "All My Life". The album earned favourable reviews from music critics.

== Release and promotion ==
Williams announced the release of Britpop on 21 May 2025. He stated,

"I set out to create the album that I wanted to write and release after I left Take That in 1995. It was the peak of Britpop and a golden age for British Music. I've worked with some of my heroes on this album; it's raw, there are more guitars and it's an album that's even more upbeat and anthemic than usual. There's some 'Brit' in there and there's certainly some 'pop' too – I'm immensely proud of this as a body of work and I'm excited for fans to hear this album".

On 19 August 2025, Williams announced a concert at Dingwalls in Camden Town, London, for 9 October 2025 in promotion of the album, dubbed as Long 90's. Marked as the smallest ticketed show of his career to date, it saw him perform both his debut solo album Life thru a Lens and Britpop in full. Following the show, Williams announced further Long 90's performances in similarly smaller venues for February 2026, taking place in Glasgow, Liverpool, London and Wolverhampton.

On 16 September 2025, the album's release date was delayed from the original date of 10 October 2025 to 6 February 2026, to avoid competing with The Life of a Showgirl by Taylor Swift. Williams said: "I could pretend it's not, but it is. It's selfish. I want a 16th No 1 album."

On 16 January 2026, the standard edition of the album was surprise released on digital platforms without prior announcement. The deluxe version of the album was digitally released on 19 January 2026.

== Singles ==
On 21 May 2025, alongside the announcement of the album and tease of the album cover artwork, Williams released the lead single, "Rocket". The single features English rock guitarist, and Black Sabbath co-founder and member, Tony Iommi. The single debuted at number 36 on the UK Singles Sales Chart. A ballad-style reworking of the single, retitled "Pocket Rocket", was released on 13 June 2025.

Williams, who was named the FIFA Music Ambassador on 14 June 2025, and Laura Pausini released "Desire" as the official FIFA anthem on 11 July 2025. They performed the song live in the 2026 FIFA Club World Cup final two days after its second release featuring Nicole Scherzinger. The single is set to be included in the deluxe edition of Britpop.

On 18 July 2025, "Spies" was released as the second single.

On 21 August 2025, "Human" was released as the third single; the song features Mexican pop duo Jesse & Joy.

On 10 October 2025, "Pretty Face" was released as the fourth single; it became the album's best performing single, charting at number 14 on the UK Singles Downloads Chart. The official music video was released on 6 November 2025.

"All My Life" was released as the fifth single on 16 January 2026, alongside the release of an official lyric video.

== Commercial performance ==
Britpop became Williams' sixteenth number one album on the UK Albums Chart, surpassing The Beatles as the act with the most UK number one albums. The album also debuted at numbers one, four and three, on the UK Album Sales, Downloads and Vinyl charts, respectively.

== Tour ==
Williams' Britpop Tour in promotion of the album began in Edinburgh on 31 May 2025, and will conclude in Mexico City on 7 October 2026.

== Critical reception ==
Professional ratings
Aggregate scores
Source	Rating
Metacritic	76/100
Review scores
Source	Rating
AllMusic	4/5 stars
Clash	8/10
The Daily Telegraph	4/5 stars
Financial Times	4/5 stars
The Guardian	4/5 stars
The Independent	3/5 stars
musicOMH	3.5/5 stars
NME	3/5 stars
Rolling Stone UK	4/5 stars
The Standard	4/5 stars

Overall, critics characterised Britpop as a spirited and self-conscious return to guitar-driven pop, applauding its confidence and entertainment value even as some questioned the coherence of its Britpop framing.

'Similarly positive, Dork gave four out of five stars, with Dan Harrison describing it as both an ego-driven spectacle and an unexpectedly reflective work. He praised its momentum and sense of fun while acknowledging that its heavy referencing occasionally risks over-familiarity. Spectrum Culture echoed this view, calling the album a lively attempt to recapture the spirit of Life Thru a Lens and noting Williams's renewed spontaneity. Reviewing the album for Rolling Stone UK, Nick Reilly characterised Britpop as "a rollicking love letter to the 1990s." He praised the swagger of the opening track "Rocket" and described the record as one of Williams's most openly fun and self-aware releases in recent years. Writing for The Guardian, Alexis Petridis similarly noted that the album reflects the music Williams had long wanted to make after leaving Take That, highlighting its melodic confidence and unpredictability, even if some tracks recall later-era Oasis. He concluded that it remains "hugely enjoyable" despite a somewhat loose concept.

The most critical perspective came from New Statesman, where Kate Mossman argued that the album contains relatively little traditional Britpop, instead reflecting Williams's established glam rock and pop sensibilities.

== Track listing ==
Britpop – Standard edition
No.	Title	Writer(s)	Producer(s)	Length
1.	"Rocket" (with Tony Iommi)	Robert Williams; Karl Brazil; Tom Longworth; Iommi	Brazil; Longworth; Sam Miller	2:46
2.	"Spies"	Williams; Brazil; Martin Terefe; Owen Parker	Brazil; Parker; Miller; Terefe; David Davidson^{[a]}	3:24
3.	"Pretty Face"	Williams; Brazil; Parker; Longworth; David Paul Taylor	Brazil; Parker; Longworth	3:47
4.	"Bite Your Tongue"	Williams; Jason Bell; Ashley Hamilton	Brazil; Terefe	2:50
5.	"Cocky"	Williams; Brazil; Parker; Gaz Coombes	Brazil; Terefe	3:07
6.	"All My Life"	Williams; Elliah Heifetz; Freddy Wexler	Brazil; Wexler; Parker^{[a]}	3:53
7.	"Human" (featuring Jesse & Joy)	Williams; Brazil; Parker	Brazil; Parker; Terefe; Davidson^{[a]}	4:03
8.	"Morrissey"	Williams; Gary Barlow	Brazil; Terefe	3:35
9.	"You"	Williams; Brazil; Parker	Brazil; Terefe	3:43
10.	"It's OK Until the Drugs Stop Working"	Williams; Brazil; Parker	Brazil; Parker; Cameron Masters^{[a]}; Richard Sidwell^{[a]}; Steve Sidwell^{[a]}; Sugi Shin^{[a]}; Florian Spies^{[a]}; Roland Tscherne^{[a]}; Martin Weismayr^{[a]}	3:16
11.	"Pocket Rocket"	Williams; Brazil; Longworth; Parker	Brazil; Parker; Terefe; Davidson^{[a]}	3:46
Total length:				38:13

Britpop – Deluxe edition
No.	Title	Writer(s)	Producer(s)	Length
12.	"Selfish Disco"	Williams; Brazil; Terefe; Parker	Parker; Brazil; Terefe	3:37
13.	"G.E.M.B"	Williams; Brazil; Parker	Parker; Brazil	3:38
14.	"Comment Section"	Williams; Brazil; Parker	Parker; Brazil; Miller; Terefe; Masters^{[a]}; R. Sidwell^{[a]}; S. Sidwell^{[a]}; Shin^{[a]}; Spies^{[a]}; Tscherne^{[a]}; Weismayr^{[a]}	3:30
15.	"Fucking Amazing"	Williams; Brazil; Parker	Parker; Brazil; Terefe	4:22
16.	"100% Beau"	Williams; Brazil; Parker; Coombes	Brazil; Terefe	3:33
17.	"Desire" (Official FIFA Anthem; featuring Laura Pausini)	Williams; Brazil; Parker; Erik Jan Grob	Brazil; Parker; S. Sidwell^{[a]}; Weismayr^{[a]}	3:43
Total length:				60:32

=== Note ===
- ^{^[a]} indicates an additional producer.

== Personnel ==
Credits adapted from Tidal.

=== Musicians ===
- Robbie Williams – vocals
- Karl Brazil – drums, percussion (tracks 1–10, 12–17); background vocals (1, 3, 6, 8–10, 12, 16, 17)
- Owen Parker – synthesizer (1, 6, 7, 17); background vocals, guitar (2–7, 9–15, 17); programming (2, 3, 6, 9–11, 13, 14, 16, 17), keyboards (4, 7, 10–13, 15), bass (6, 7, 9–11, 13, 15), arrangement (10, 14), electric guitar (16)
- Sam Miller – programming (1, 2, 14); percussion, synthesizer (6, 14)
- Tom Longworth – background vocals, guitar (1, 3); bass (1)
- Glenn Hughes – background vocals (1)
- Tony Iommi – guitar (1)
- Emily Parker – background vocals (2, 3, 7, 9–11, 13–15, 17)
- David Angell – violin (2, 7, 11)
- David Davidson – violin (2, 7, 11)
- Kristin Wilkinson – viola (2, 7, 11)
- The Love Sponge Strings – strings (2, 7)
- Carole Rabinowitz – cello (2)
- Gary Nuttall – background vocals (3, 4, 8), guitar (3, 8)
- Jeremy Meehan – bass (3, 14)
- Martin Terefe – bass (4, 5, 9, 12, 15, 16), guitar (4, 12), piano (5, 12), programming (7), background vocals (8, 9, 16), vocoder (8)
- Oskar Winberg – programming (4, 8, 9); background vocals, keyboards (4, 8)
- Nikolaj Torp Larsen – keyboards (4, 16), piano (10)
- Gaz Coombes – background vocals (5, 16); guitar, percussion (5); acoustic guitar, bass, electric guitar, synthesizer, tambourine (16)
- Nick Fowler – kazoo (5), electric guitar (16)
- Garo Nahoulakian – percussion (5), electric guitar (16)
- Claes Björklund – programming (5, 8, 15), synthesizer (5, 15), keyboards (8)
- Nikola Stajic – guitar (6)
- Cremaine Booker – cello (7, 11)
- Chris Martin – guitar, keyboards, synthesizer (7)
- Austin Brown – glockenspiel (7)
- Jesse Huerta – guitar (7)
- Joy Huerta – vocals (7)
- Sara-Jane Skeete – background vocals (8, 13)
- Gary Barlow – background vocals (8)
- Vienna Synchron Orchestra – orchestra (10, 14, 17)
- Steve Sidwell – arrangement (10, 14)
- Louise Bagan – background vocals (12)
- Hot City Horns – brass (13)
  - Kenji Fenton – saxophone (13)
  - Paul Burton – trombone (13)
  - Michael Craig Davis – trumpet (13)
- Ben Edwards – trumpet (14)
- Tommy Sims – guitar (15)
- Andrea Rocha – background vocals (17)
- George Murphy – programming (17)
- Franz König – bass (17)
- Kristof Sziman – bass (17)
- Laszlo Magyar – bass (17)
- Robert Mako – bass (17)
- Andreas Meissl – trumpet (17)
- Marc Cardwell-Hood – trumpet (17)
- Marc Osterer – trumpet (17)
- Bernhard Ploss – trombone (17)
- Jure Medvesek – trombone (17)
- Matthew Herrmann – trombone (17)
- Matthias Reindl – trombone (17)
- Andrej Kasijan – French horn (17)
- Daniel Palkövi – French horn (17)
- Jan Smutny – French horn (17)
- Mate Börzsönyi – French horn (17)
- Nevena Grbic – French horn (17)
- Bence Toth – tuba (17)
- Alessandro Malizia – violin (17)
- Alison Lie – violin (17)
- Amora De Swardt – violin (17)
- Anastasia Burak – violin (17)
- Djanay Tulenova – violin (17)
- Firangiz Abdullayeva – violin (17)
- I-Ping Cheng – violin (17)
- Jevgenijs Cepoveckis – violin (17)
- Johanna Chauta – violin (17)
- Katarina Veselska – violin (17)
- Katarzyna Pernach – violin (17)
- Lukas Medlam – violin (17)
- Magdalena Wieckowska – violin (17)
- Maria Prem – violin (17)
- Marian Svetlik – violin (17)
- Marina Dimitrova – violin (17)
- Miao-Yu Hung – violin (17)
- Milica Pajdic – violin (17)
- Plamena Ivanova – violin (17)
- Rainer Sulzgruber – violin (17)
- Willem Barboritsch – violin (17)
- Zhuldys Kussainova – violin (17)
- Aliona Komarovskaia – viola (17)
- Angelica Cruz – viola (17)
- Aniko Biro – viola (17)
- Anna Firsanova – viola (17)
- Giorgia Veneziano – viola (17)
- Mihoko Ikezawa – viola (17)
- Nikita Gerkusov – viola (17)
- Taha Abedian – viola (17)
- Anzel Gerber – cello (17)
- Elisaveta Sharakhovskaya – cello (17)
- Gergely Kolozsvari – cello (17)
- Michael Dukhnych – cello (17)
- Michael Jurecka – cello (17)
- Oliver Mohacsi – cello (17)
- Laura Pausini – vocals (17)

=== Technical ===
- George Murphy – engineering (1–5, 7, 8, 10, 14, 17), mixing (1, 3, 10)
- Sam Miller – engineering (1, 6, 9, 16), mixing (6, 13, 14)
- Mike Exeter – engineering (1)
- Tom Longworth – engineering (1)
- Owen Parker – engineering (2, 3, 7, 9–15, 17)
- Taylor Pollard – engineering (2, 7, 11)
- Oskar Winberg – engineering (4, 5, 7–9, 11, 12, 14–16), mixing (2, 4, 7–9, 11, 12, 15)
- Niclas Lindström – engineering (5, 12), mixing (12)
- Gaz Coombes – engineering, mixing (5, 16)
- Dan Glashauser – engineering (6)
- Freddy Wexler – engineering (6)
- Oli Jacobs – engineering (6)
- Bill Rahko – engineering (7)
- Claes Björklund – engineering (8, 15)
- Calle Gustavsson – engineering (12)
- Richard Flack – engineering, mixing (17)
- Paolo Carta – engineering (17)
- Martin Terefe – mixing (2, 4, 7–12, 15)
- Karl Brazil – mixing (3)
- Matt Colton – mastering (1–16)
- Stuart Hawkes – mastering (17)
- Marton Barka – contracting (10, 14)
- Astrid Hoeger – project coordination (10, 14)

== Charts ==
Chart performance for Britpop
Chart (2026)	Peak position
Australian Albums (ARIA)	5
Austrian Albums (Ö3 Austria)	5
Belgian Albums (Ultratop Flanders)	6
Belgian Albums (Ultratop Wallonia)	5
Croatian International Albums (HDU)	21
Dutch Albums (Album Top 100)	24
Finnish Physical Albums (Suomen virallinen lista)	10
French Albums (SNEP)	97
German Albums (Offizielle Top 100)	3
German Pop Albums (Offizielle Top 100)	1
Greek Albums (IFPI)	73
Hungarian Albums (MAHASZ)	5
Irish Albums (Official Charts)	15
Italian Albums (FIMI)	69
Portuguese Albums (AFP)	129
Scottish Albums (Official Charts)	2
Spanish Albums (Promusicae)	41
Swiss Albums (Schweizer Hitparade)	2
UK Albums (Official Charts)	1
