= Murrayfield Stadium =

Rugby stadium in Edinburgh, Scotland

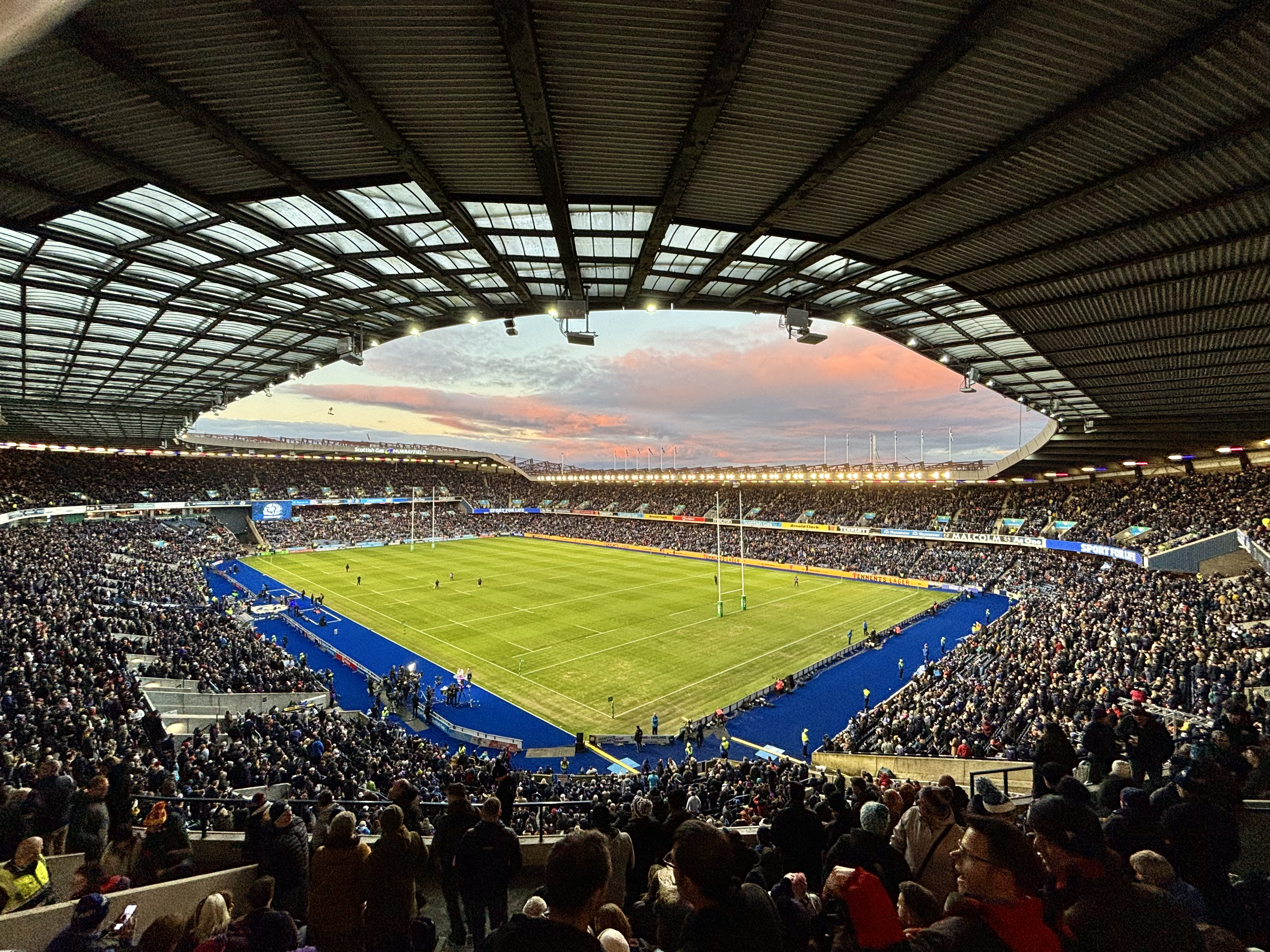
- The stadium's interior, 2025
- Interactive map of Murrayfield Stadium
- Location: Roseburn Street; Edinburgh; EH12 5PJ
- Owner: Scottish Rugby Union
- Operator: Scottish Rugby Union
- Capacity: 67,144
- Surface: Desso GrassMaster hybrid pitch
- Record attendance: 104,000 (1975 Five Nations – Scotland vs Wales)
- Public transit: Haymarket; Murrayfield Stadium

Construction
- Opened: 21 March 1925; 101 years ago
- Renovated: 1995; 31 years ago

Tenants
- Scotland national rugby union team (1925–present); Edinburgh Rugby (1996–2017, 2018–present selected matches); Edinburgh Sevens (2007–2011); Scottish Claymores (1995–2002)

Murrayfield Stadium is a rugby union stadium located in the area of the same name in Edinburgh, Scotland. The stadium is owned by the Scottish Rugby Union (SRU) and serves as its headquarters, and is the national stadium of the Scotland national rugby union team. With a seating capacity of 67,144, it is the largest stadium in Scotland, the fifth largest in the United Kingdom, and the twenty-second largest in Europe.

It officially opened on 21 March 1925 with a game between Scotland and England. The game was won by Scotland who emerged victorious following a Grand Slam. The stadium hosts the majority of Scotland's home test matches and the Scottish Hydro Electric Cup final, as well as certain Edinburgh Rugby matches in the URC and European Rugby Champions Cup.

Though primarily a rugby union stadium, Murrayfield has in the past hosted American football, rugby league and association football matches, as well as numerous music concerts. Currently, the stadium is known as Scottish Gas Murrayfield Stadium for sponsorship reasons.

== History ==
=== Purchase of land ===
The SRU identified 19 acres of land at Murrayfield, purchasing this from Edinburgh Polo Club at Murrayfield, having raised money through debentures. A stand and three embankments were constructed, which took two years. Previous internationals had been played at Inverleith but it was not large enough to cope with the increasing number of spectators. Arthur Sellers was the stadium's first groundsman, having previously prepared the pitches at Inverleith. On 21 March 1925 England were the first team to visit Murrayfield, with 70,000 people watching Scotland beat them to win their first Five Nations Championship Grand Slam.

=== Usage during WWII ===
During the Second World War the ground at Murrayfield was offered to the nation and was taken over by the Royal Army Service Corps and used as a supply depot. During the war years the armed forces sports authorities managed to arrange two Scotland v. England services internationals each year, on a home-and-away basis. Scotland's home matches were played at Inverleith for the first two years with a return to Murrayfield in 1944 after that ground's derequisition.

=== Recent history ===
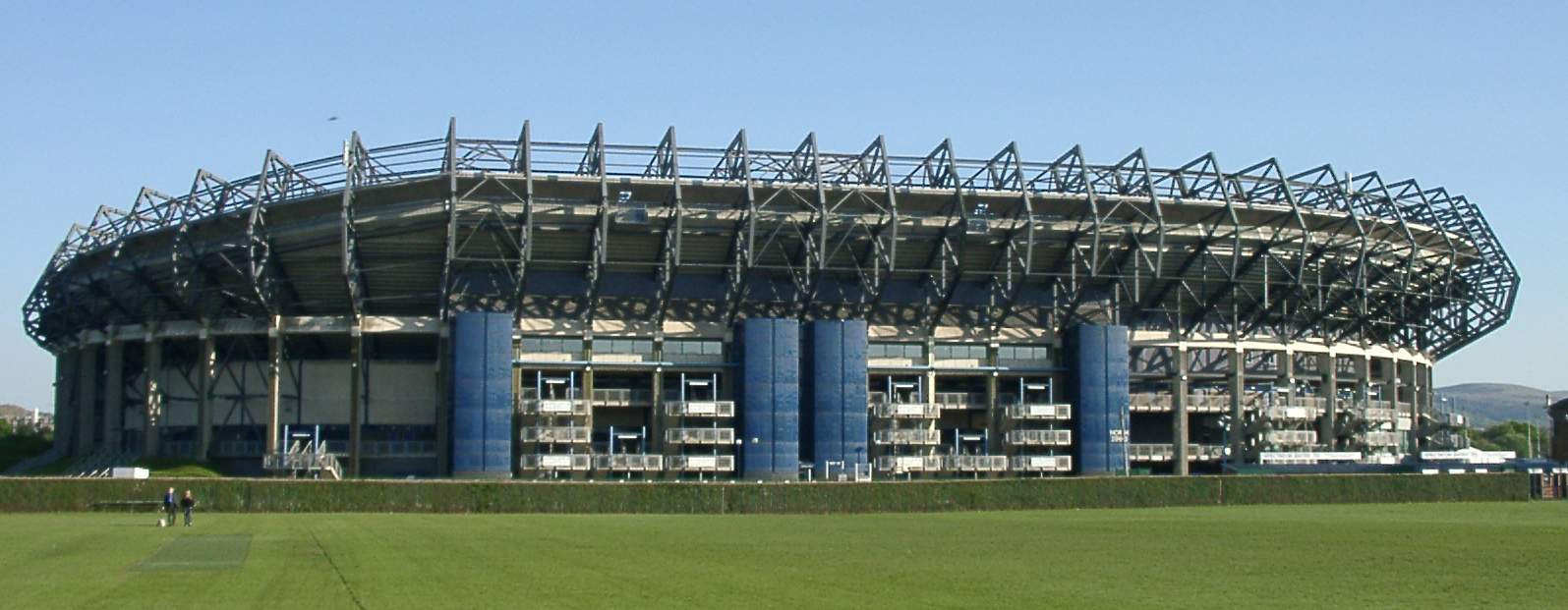
Exterior of Murrayfield, May 2005

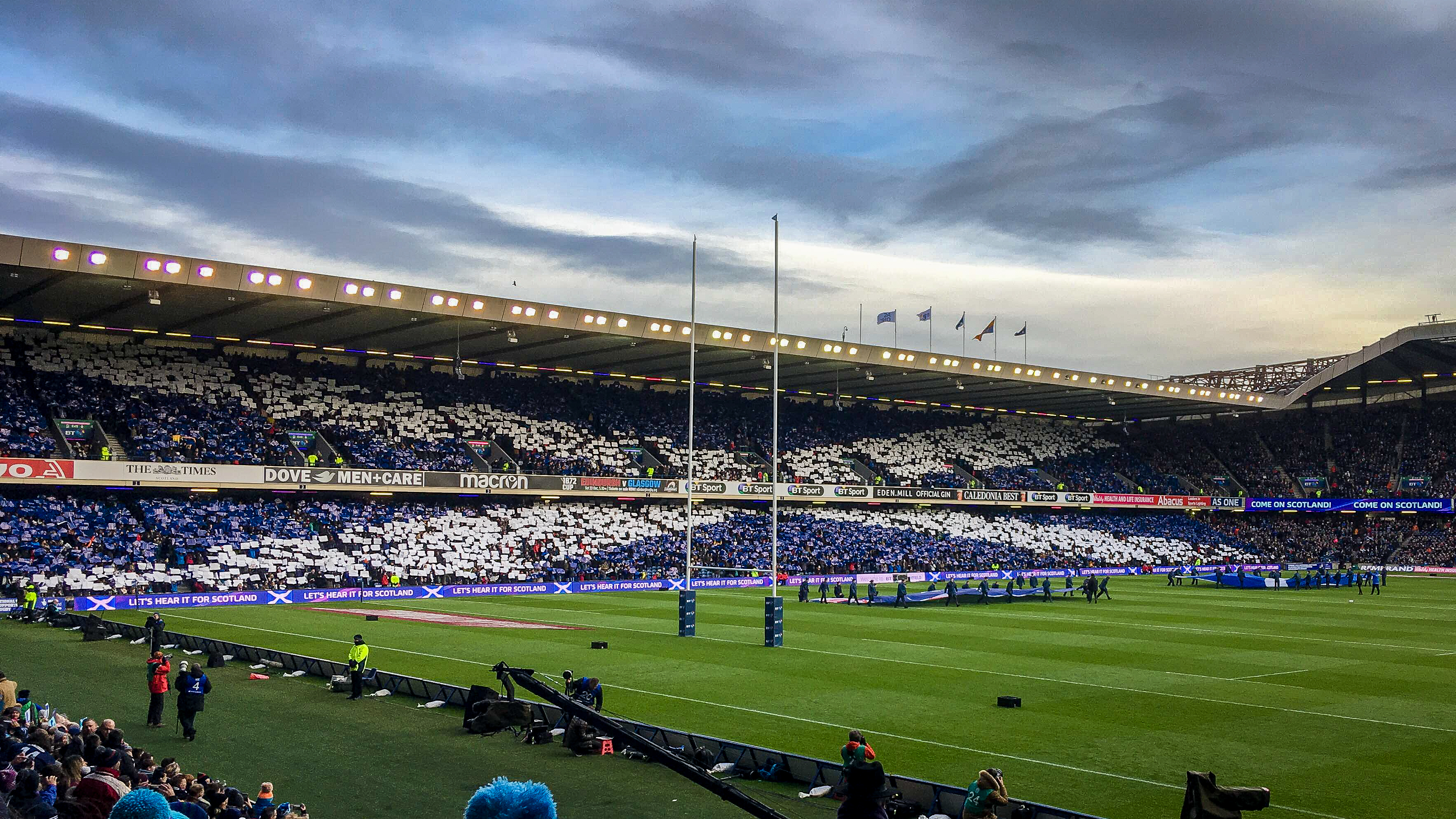
Interior of Murrayfield depicting the national flag of Scotland, the Saltire, in the stands

Murrayfield's record attendance of 104,000 was set on 1 March 1975 when Scotland defeated Wales 12–10 during the 1975 Five Nations Championship. This attendance stood as a world record until 1999, and remains a European record. The East stand was built in 1983.

In October 1991 another debenture scheme was launched, to finance a more comprehensive redevelopment of the West Stand. The new West Stand was designed with a 48-metre cantilever roof. The old West Stand housed a museum, but this was not replaced and plans for a new visitor centre were shelved when the game turned professional. The first phase was completed in January 1993 with the new north and south stands opening. In February 1994 the centre section of the new West Stand opened. The work was carried out by Tilbury Douglas.

In 1994, Murrayfield completed a £50-million renovation where floodlights were installed for the first time.

In October 2012, SRU chief executive Mark Dodson told the BBC that it was actively seeking a name sponsor for Murrayfield:

The single biggest piece of our inventory is our national stadium. We would like to see if we can monetise that. It would be crazy for us not to look at using our single biggest piece of inventory to drive revenue. We want to get the right price for it.

In addition, Dodson indicated that the SRU was actively seeking a site for a completely new stadium with a capacity of 10,000 to 15,000 as a future home for Edinburgh Rugby. The pitch was damaged by nematodes in the lead up to the 2013 autumn internationals. This led the SRU to replace the grass with a Desso surface from the start of the 2014 season. A naming rights deal with BT was agreed in May 2014, resulting in the stadium being officially named as the BT Murrayfield Stadium.

Scottish Rugby and Scottish Gas agreed a new five-year partnership deal starting in July 2023. This will result in the creation of a Club & Community Net Zero Fund worth £2 million to ensure Scottish clubs can save on energy bills and carbon emissions. Scottish Gas will also invest in the women's game through shirt and stadium sponsorship, resulting in an official name change for the stadium to Scottish Gas Murrayfield.

== Location ==
Murrayfield is located next to Murrayfield Ice Rink, Murrayfield Curling Rink, and is close to Edinburgh Zoo. It is named after the area of Edinburgh it is located in, Murrayfield. There are two cricket pitches in the immediate vicinity at Roseburn Park used by Murrayfield DAFS CC and four rugby pitches owned by the SRU which were used by teams including the amateur club Murrayfield Wanderers RFC. Wanderers and their predecessors had played there since 1902 but were asked to vacate in 2018 as the governing body had plans to develop the land. Wanderers moved their training base to Roseburn but continued to hire the Murrayfield pitches for some matches.

== Transport ==
=== Buses ===
The stadium is served by Lothian Bus services 12, 22, 26, 31 and the Airlink 100 along Corstorphine Road. Post-match traffic congestion is common along this route.

=== Rail ===
Despite the line running adjacent to the stadium, the closest railway station to the stadium is Haymarket, which lies a mile to the East.

Interchange with the Edinburgh Trams is available at Haymarket, Edinburgh Park and Edinburgh Gateway stations. Edinburgh Waverley is a short walk from the St Andrew Square tram stop.

=== Tram ===
Murrayfield Stadium tram stop is located adjacent to the stadium entrance turnstiles on Roseburn Street. Access to the platform is by a flight of stairs or lift. As part of crowd-management measures, ticketing machines are situated at the bottom of the staircase and not the platform.

Preceding station	Edinburgh Trams	Following station
Haymarket towards Newhaven	Newhaven - Edinburgh Airport	Balgreen towards Airport

== Rugby union ==
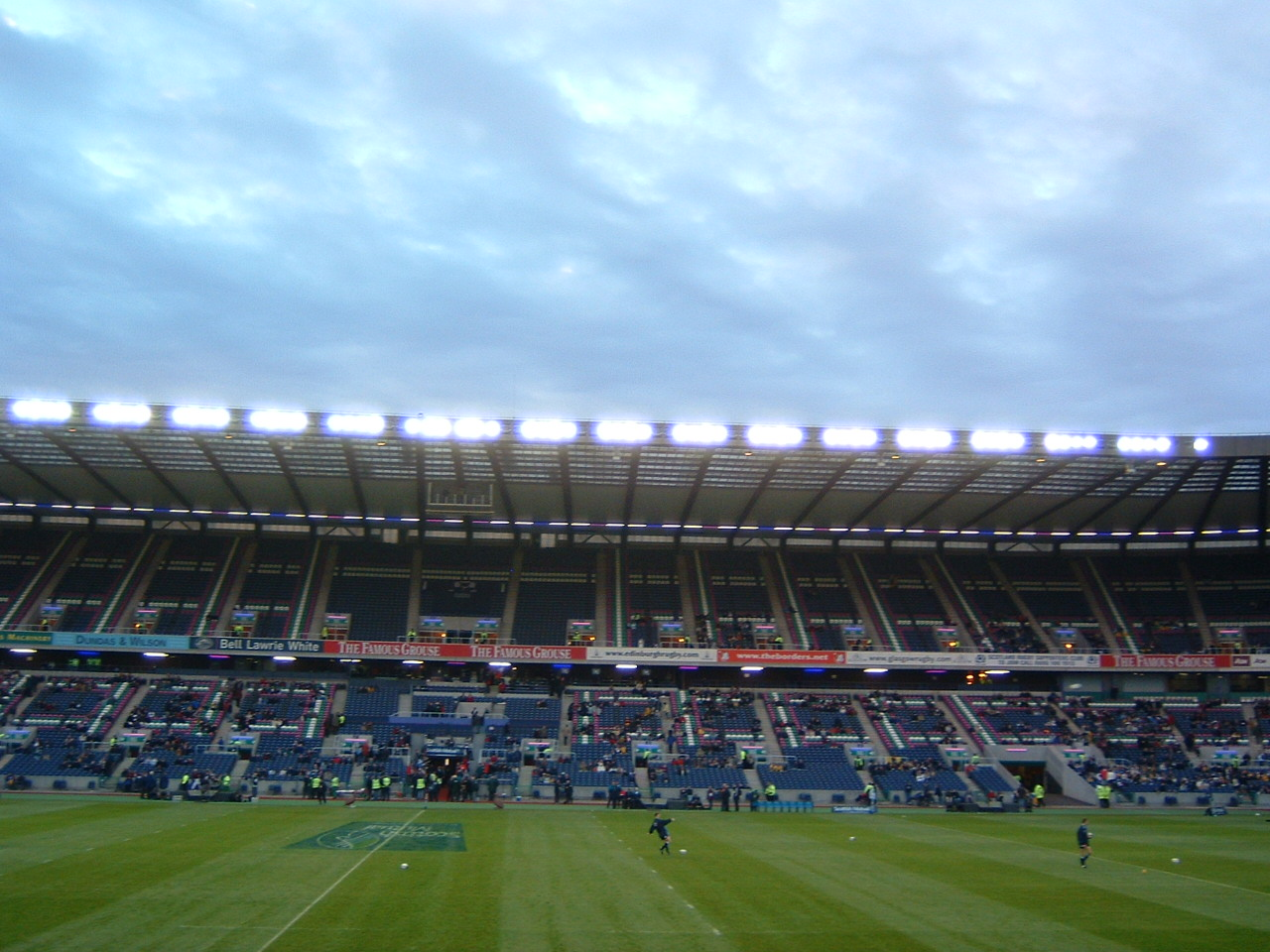
Murrayfield Stadium in 2002.

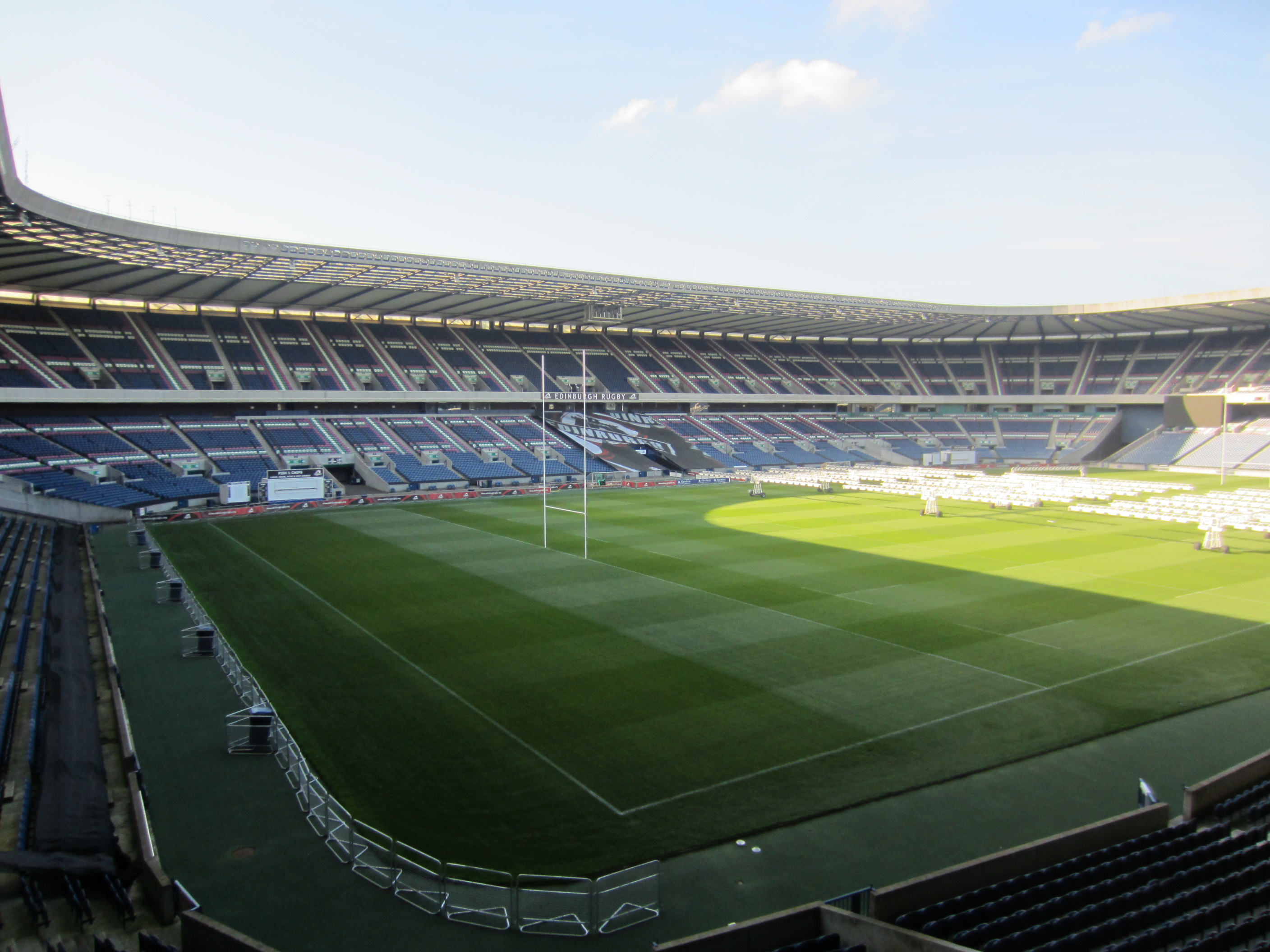
Interior of Murrayfield

Murrayfield is used for most Scottish international rugby union matches, with all Scotland's Six Nations home games being played in the stadium. The stadium also hosted all of Edinburgh's matches between 1996 and January 2017. (For Pro14 matches, only the lower tier of the East Stand is typically used.) Since February 2018 all Edinburgh matches are once again held at Murrayfield; with work now finished on the construction of a new 7,800 capacity stadium on the back pitches to host Edinburgh Rugby from the start of the 2021/22 season.

From 2007 to 2011, Murrayfield hosted the Edinburgh 7s, then the final event in the annual IRB Sevens World Series (now known as SVNS) in rugby sevens, but that tournament was moved to Glasgow starting in 2012 due to low attendance. Murrayfield hosted select matches from the 2007 Rugby World Cup. The stadium also hosted the Heineken Cup Final in 2005, when Toulouse beat Stade Français Paris 18–12, again in 2009, with Leinster defeating Leicester 19–16 and finally in 2017 with Saracens defeating Clermont 28–17.

=== Rugby World Cup ===
Murrayfield hosted matches of the 1991, 1999 and 2007 Rugby World Cups.

==== 1991 ====
Date	Competition	Home team		Away team		Attendance
5 October 1991	1991 Rugby World Cup Pool 2	Scotland	47	Japan	9	40,000
9 October 1991	1991 Rugby World Cup Pool 2	Scotland	51	Zimbabwe	12	35,000
12 October 1991	1991 Rugby World Cup Pool 2	Scotland	24	Ireland	15	54,000
19 October 1991	1991 Rugby World Cup Quarter-final 2	Scotland	28	Western Samoa	6	54,000
26 October 1991	1991 Rugby World Cup Semi-final 1	Scotland	6	England	9	54,000

==== 1999 ====
Date	Competition	Home team		Away team		Attendance
3 October 1999	1999 Rugby World Cup Pool A	Scotland	29	South Africa	46	57,612
8 October 1999	1999 Rugby World Cup Pool A	Scotland	43	Uruguay	12	9,463
10 October 1999	1999 Rugby World Cup Pool A	South Africa	47	Spain	3	4,769
16 October 1999	1999 Rugby World Cup Pool A	Scotland	40	Spain	0	17,593
20 October 1999	1999 Rugby World Cup Quarter-final play-off 3	Scotland	35	Samoa	20	20,000
24 October 1999	1999 Rugby World Cup Quarter-final 3	Scotland	18	New Zealand	30	59,750

==== 2007 ====
Date	Competition	Home team		Away team		Attendance
18 September 2007	2007 Rugby World Cup Pool C	Scotland	42	Romania	0	31,222
23 September 2007	2007 Rugby World Cup Pool C	Scotland	0	New Zealand	40	64,558

== Rugby league ==
Although primarily a rugby union stadium, Murrayfield hosted the Rugby League Challenge Cup Finals of 2000 and 2002. The stadium hosted rugby league's Super League Magic Weekend in 2009. The record for a rugby league attendance at the stadium is 67,247 for the 2000 Challenge Cup Final.

== Other sports ==
=== Association football ===
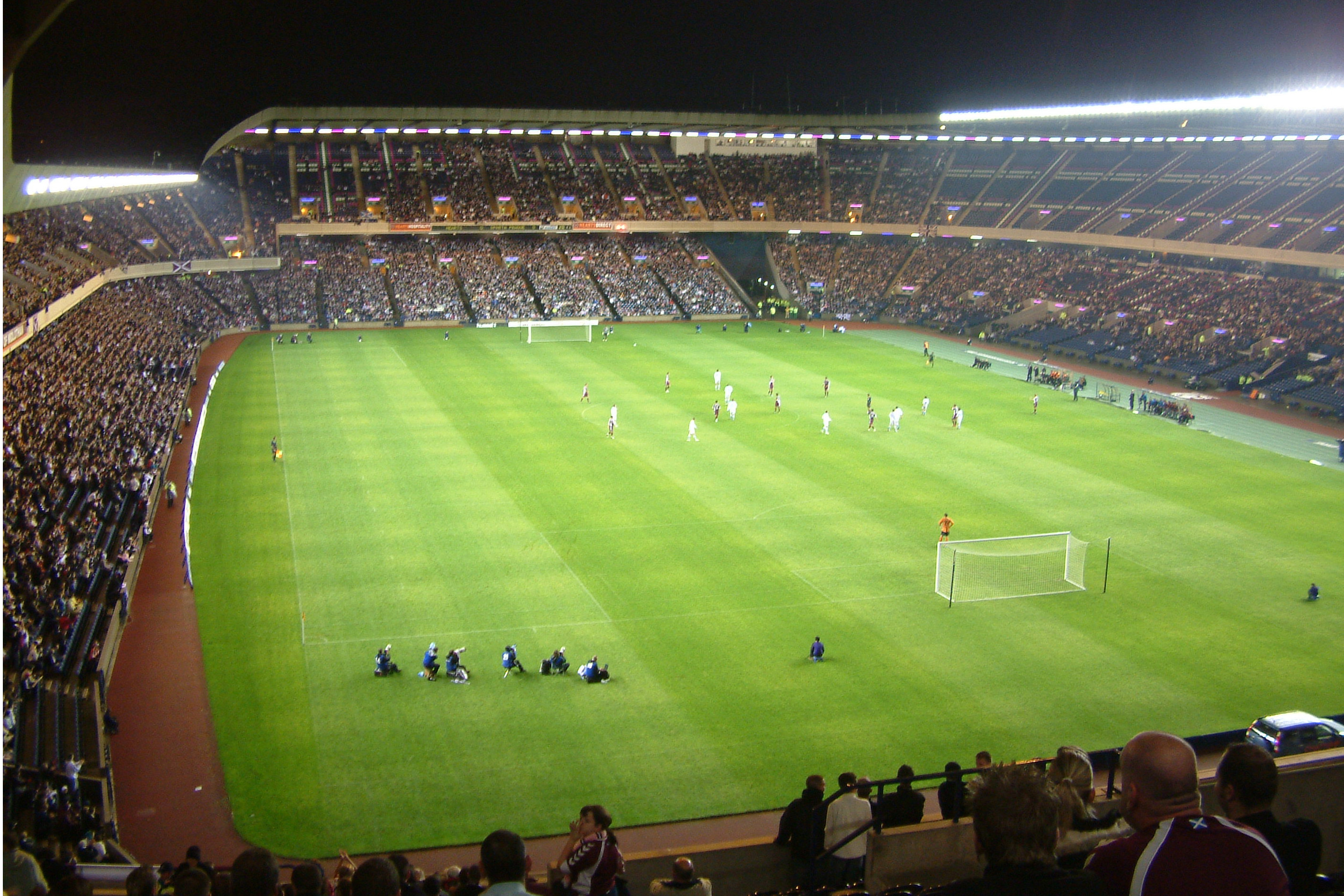
Hearts v Sparta Prague at Murrayfield during the UEFA Cup, 2006

Murrayfield has also hosted association football matches. In December 2003, the SRU board agreed to let local Scottish Premier League side Hearts lease the stadium for match days. Later that month, UEFA confirmed that Hearts' own ground, Tynecastle did not meet the minimum criteria for European matches from the 2004–05 season. Hearts used Murrayfield as their home venue for European matches for three years until Hearts made adjustments to Tynecastle that made it compliant with UEFA regulations. Additionally, both Hearts and Edinburgh neighbours Hibernian have played preseason friendlies against FC Barcelona at Murrayfield. Almost 58,000 people attended to watch Hearts play Barcelona in July 2007, recording the largest crowd at an association football match in Edinburgh for 51 years.

In 2014, Glasgow club Celtic played two qualifying matches at the stadium due to Celtic Park being unavailable because of Glasgow's hosting of the 2014 Commonwealth Games. Hearts again used the stadium for home games during the 2017–18 Scottish Premiership, due to the delays in construction of a new main stand at Tynecastle. Murrayfield hosted one of the 2018–19 Scottish League Cup semi-finals, played between Hearts and Celtic, in October 2018. That match attracted an attendance of 61,161, the second-largest ever recorded for a football match in Edinburgh. In July 2019, Murrayfield hosted a pre-season friendly between Liverpool and Napoli, that attracted a crowd of 65,442 which was the highest attendance of fans at a football match in Scotland since the 1989 Scottish Cup Final. On 19 July 2023, Manchester United faced Olympique Lyonnais at Murrayfield in front of a crowd of 48,484. On 20 March 2024, it was announced that Manchester United would return for the second successive year to play a pre-season match at Murrayfield, taking on Rangers on 20 July 2024. in front of 56,574

=== American football ===
Murrayfield has played host to American football and was one of two home venues for the now defunct Scottish Claymores in the NFL Europa between 1995 and 2004, the other being Hampden Park in Glasgow. Additionally, it hosted World Bowl '96 on 23 June 1996. It has been mentioned as a potential future host site for the NFL International Series, should the National Football League add future games outside the series' current permanent home, Tottenham Hotspur Stadium in London. Two other London stadiums, Wembley Stadium and Twickenham Stadium, are the only other grounds in Britain to host NFL matches.

== Music ==
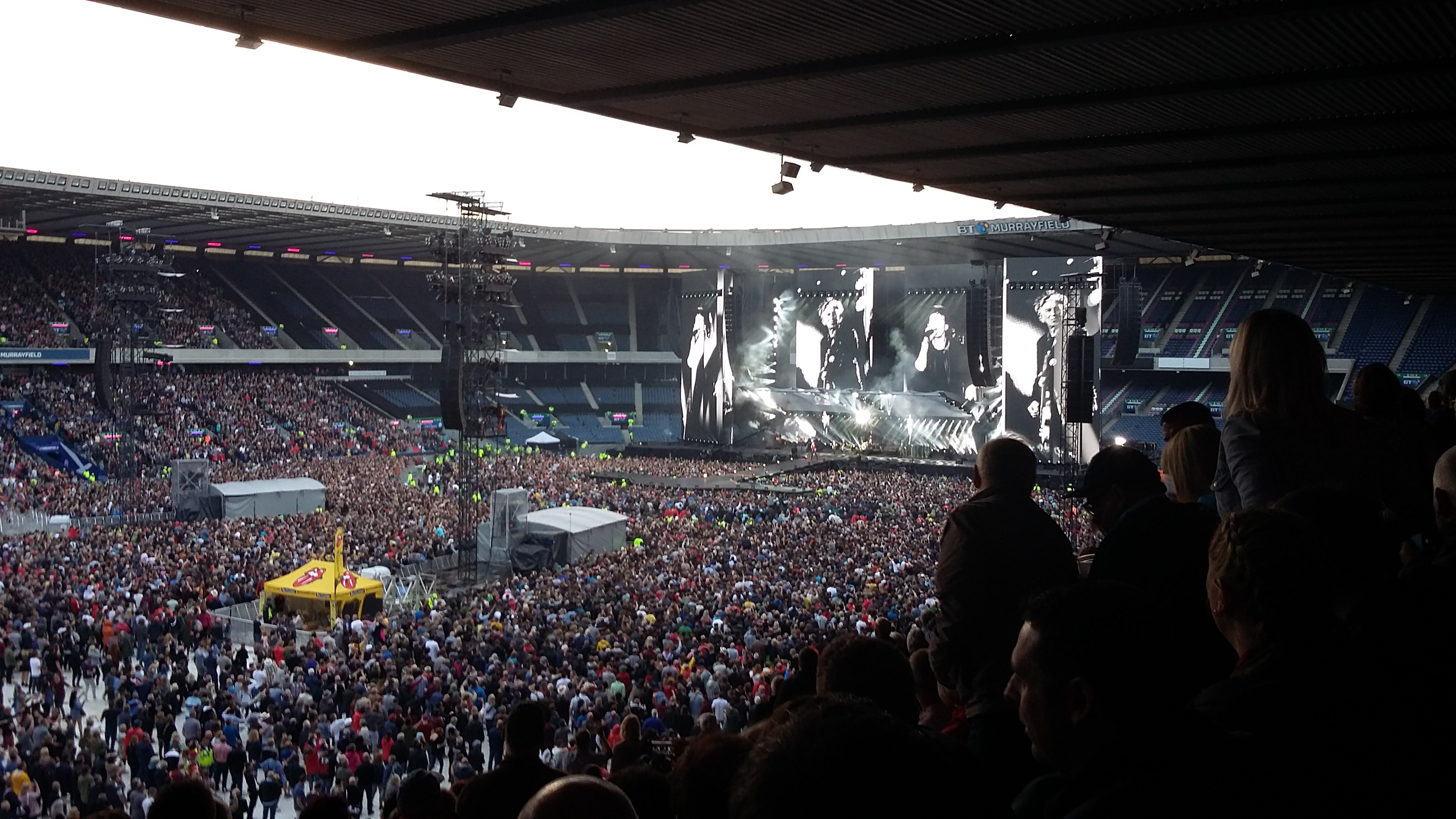
Murrayfield during a concert held by The Rolling Stones, 2018

David Bowie played to a capacity crowd of 47,000 people on 28 June 1983. Simple Minds were scheduled to play at the stadium in 1989, but pulled out because of Jim Kerr's objections to the venue's administrators allowing Scottish rugby players to attend the sport's centenary celebrations in South Africa, which was then still under apartheid. On 30 June 1996, Tina Turner played at Murrayfield as part of her Wildest Dreams Tour. In September 1997 U2 played at Murrayfield as part of their Popmart Tour. On 3 June 1999, The Rolling Stones played to 51,000 on their No Security Tour. On 8 July 1999 Celine Dion performed her Let's Talk About Love World Tour as she sold out the full venue of 67,000, on her first ever show in Scotland. In July 2005, Murrayfield hosted the final Live 8 concert, Edinburgh 50,000 – The Final Push, with performances including James Brown, Texas and The Proclaimers. Oasis played a sold-out show on 17 June 2009, as part of their world tour. Some antisocial behaviour at this event affected the stadium's licensing arrangements when they were reviewed a few months later. This was the last time Oasis would play a concert in Scotland and the second time they had played the stadium, the first being on their Standing on the Shoulder of Giants Tour in 2000.

Bon Jovi performed at the stadium on 22 June 2011 as part of their tour. Madonna performed to a sell-out crowd of 52,160 on 21 July 2012 as part of the MDNA Tour. On 3 June 2014, One Direction performed to over 64,000 fans at Murrayfield as part of their Where We Are Stadium Tour. Foo Fighters performed at Murrayfield Stadium as part of their Sonic Highways World Tour on 8 September 2015. The band were originally supposed to play Murrayfield on 23 June 2015 but this was cancelled and rescheduled after Dave Grohl broke his foot at European Festival that same month. The Spice Girls performed to over 55,000 fans on 8 June 2019 as part of their Spice World tour, it was their first Scottish concert in 21 years. On May 20, 2023, Beyoncé became the first Black woman since Tina Turner in 1996 to perform at the stadium in front of a sold-out audience of 55,000 people as part of her triumphant Renaissance World Tour. Taylor Swift broke the all time Scottish concert attendance record 3 times when The Eras Tour came to Murrayfield for 3 nights on 7, 8 and 9 June 2024, playing to 73,000 people each night, and nearly 220,000 people over the 3 nights.

Date	Performer(s)	Opening act(s)	Tour/Event	Attendance	Notes
28 June 1983	David Bowie	Thompson Twins, Icehouse	Serious Moonlight Tour	47,444	
1 August 1987	U2	The Pogues, Runrig, The Mission, Love and Money	The Joshua Tree Tour		
27 July 1995	R.E.M.	The Cranberries, Belly, Spearhead	Monster Tour	46,796 / 46,796	
30 June 1996	Tina Turner		Wildest Dreams		
4 August 1996	Eagles	Kenny Wayne Shepherd	Hell Freezes Over Tour	49,312 / 49,312	
2 September 1997	U2	The Seahorses	PopMart Tour	50,439 / 50,439	
4 June 1999	The Rolling Stones	Sheryl Crow	No Security Tour	44,283 / 44,283	
8 July 1999	Celine Dion	The Corrs	Let's Talk About Love World Tour	53,013 / 60,000	
29 July 2000	Oasis	Happy Mondays, Doves	Standing on the Shoulder of Giants Tour		
28 & 29 June 2003	Robbie Williams	Ash	Weekends of Mass Distraction Tour		
14 June 2004	Red Hot Chili Peppers	N.E.R.D., Ash	Roll on the Red Tour		
6 July 2005	Various Acts		Live 8 Scotland		
21 July 2007	Bryan Adams		Anthology Tour		
17 June 2009	Oasis	Kasabian, The Enemy, Reverend and the Makers	Dig Out Your Soul Tour		
22 June 2011	Bon Jovi	Vintage Trouble	Bon Jovi Live	53,043 / 53,043	
26 June 2011	Kings Of Leon	Zac Brown Band, White Lies, The Walkmen	Come Around Sundown World Tour		
21 July 2012	Madonna	Alesso	The MDNA Tour	52,160 / 52,160	
3 June 2014	One Direction	5 Seconds of Summer	Where We Are Tour	64,623 / 64,623	
8 September 2015	Foo Fighters	Royal Blood, Honeyblood	Sonic Highways World Tour		
9 June 2017	Robbie Williams	Erasure	The Heavy Entertainment Show Tour		
9 June 2018	The Rolling Stones	Richard Ashcroft	No Filter Tour	54,221 / 54,221	
8 June 2019	Spice Girls	Jess Glynne	Spice World – 2019 Tour	55,211 / 55,211	
22 June 2022	Eagles	Little Big Town	Eagles 50 Years Tour		
20 May 2023	Beyoncé		Renaissance World Tour	55,834 / 55,834	
26 & 27 May 2023	Harry Styles	Wet Leg	Love On Tour		
30 May 2023	Bruce Springsteen		Springsteen and E Street Band 2023 Tour		
7–9 June 2024	Taylor Swift	Paramore	The Eras Tour	219,000 / 219,000	
31 May 2025	Robbie Williams	The Lottery Winners	Britpop Tour		
8,9 & 12 August 2025	Oasis	Richard Ashcroft, Cast	Oasis Live '25 Tour		
21 August 2025	AC/DC	The Pretty Reckless	Power Up Tour		
24 & 25 July 2026	Luke Combs	The Teskey Brothers, Ty Myers, The Castellows	My Kinda Saturday Night Tour		
28 August 2026	Bon Jovi		Forever Tour		

== See also ==
- Rugby union in Scotland
- Sport in Scotland
- Scottish Women's Rugby Union
- Lists of stadiums

Preceded by None	Rugby World Cup Sevens host venue 1993	Succeeded by Hong Kong Stadium; Hong Kong
Preceded by Twickenham; London	Heineken Cup final venue 2004–05	Succeeded by Millennium Stadium; Cardiff
Preceded by Millennium Stadium; Cardiff	Heineken Cup final venue 2008–09	Succeeded by Stade de France; Paris
Preceded by Parc Olympique Lyonnais; Lyon	European Rugby Champions Cup; Final Venue; 2016–17	Succeeded by San Mamés Stadium; Bilbao
Preceded by Parc Olympique Lyonnais; Lyon	European Rugby Challenge Cup; Final Venue; 2016–17	Succeeded by San Mamés Stadium; Bilbao
