= Arthur Sellers (Scottish cricketer) =

Scottish cricketer

Personal information
- Full name: Arthur Ernest Sellers
- Born: 23 February 1876; Mansfield, Nottinghamshire, England
- Died: 9 February 1949 (aged 72); Edinburgh, Midlothian, Scotland
- Batting: Right-handed
- Bowling: Right-arm medium

Domestic team information
- Years: Team
- 1920–1922: Scotland

Career statistics
Competition	First-class
Matches	2
Runs scored	29
Batting average	9.66
100s/50s	–/–
Top score	17
Balls bowled	369
Wickets	8
Bowling average	19.12
5 wickets in innings	1
10 wickets in match	–
Best bowling	5/22
Catches/stumpings	–/–
- Source: Cricinfo, 28 July 2022

Arthur Ernest Sellers (23 February 1876 — 9 February 1949) was an English-born Scottish first-class cricketer and groundskeeper.

Sellers was born at Mansfield in February 1876. He moved to Scotland as a young child when his father, Tom Sellers, moved there to take up a groundskeeping job at The Grange Club. A club cricketer for Carlton Cricket Club, he played two first-class matches for Scotland in 1920 and 1922; he was a late debutant in first-class cricket, being aged 44 in 1920. His appearance in 1920 came against Ireland at Edinburgh, with his 1922 appearance coming against the Marylebone Cricket Club at Lord's. Playing as a right-arm medium pace bowler in the Scottish side, Sellers took 8 wickets at an average of 19.12;. he took one five wicket haul, with figures of 5 for 22 against Ireland. A knee injury later ended his club career while he was still engaged as a professional at Carlton.

Outside of cricket, Sellers was a groundsman. He was employed by Scottish Rugby Union and was responsible for preparing all of Scotland's home international rugby pitches at Inverleith and Murrayfield. Sellers died at Edinburgh in February 1949.
