= Better Man (film) =

2024 film by Michael Gracey

- Australian theatrical release poster
- Directed by: Michael Gracey
- Written by: Simon Gleeson; Oliver Cole; Michael Gracey
- Produced by: Paul Currie; Michael Gracey; Coco Xiaolu Ma; Craig McMahon; Jules Daly
- Starring: Robbie Williams; Jonno Davies; Raechelle Banno; Steve Pemberton; Alison Steadman
- Cinematography: Erik A. Wilson
- Edited by: Jeff Groth; Spencer Susser; Martin Connor; Lee Smith; Patrick Correll
- Music by: Batu Sener (score); Robbie Williams (songs)
- Production companies: Sina Studios; Facing East Entertainment; The Lost Bandits; Footloose Productions; Partizan Films
- Distributed by: Roadshow Films (Australia and New Zealand); Paramount Pictures (United States, Canada, France and Japan)
- Release dates: 30 August 2024 (Telluride); 25 December 2024 (United States); 26 December 2024 (Australia)
- Running time: 135 minutes
- Countries: Australia; United States
- Language: English
- Budget: $110 million
- Box office: $22.5 million

Better Man is a 2024 biographical jukebox musical drama film directed by Michael Gracey from a screenplay by Gracey, Simon Gleeson and Oliver Cole. It is based on the life of the English singer Robbie Williams and stars Williams, Jonno Davies, Raechelle Banno, Steve Pemberton and Alison Steadman.

Development on Better Man began in February 2021, after Gracey was announced as director and co-writer alongside Gleeson and Cole. Williams is portrayed as an anthropomorphic chimpanzee, performed by Davies using motion capture, and co-voiced by Williams: this was due to Williams' perception of himself as a "performing monkey" and Gracey's vision of the film as a "satirical musical". No character comments on his appearance. Williams also re-recorded several songs from his discography for the film. Principal photography began in May 2022 and lasted until June 2023, with filming locations including Docklands Studios in Melbourne, Regent Street and the Royal Albert Hall in London.

Better Man premiered at the 51st Telluride Film Festival on 30 August 2024 and was theatrically released in the United States on 25 December, by Paramount Pictures, and in the United Kingdom a day later, by Entertainment Film Distributors. It grossed $22.5 million worldwide, becoming a box-office bomb, (Note: Attributed to multiple sources) but received positive reviews. Better Man won nine AACTA Awards, including for Best Film, and was nominated for Best Visual Effects at the Academy Awards, Critics' Choice Awards, BAFTA Film Awards and Visual Effects Society Awards.

== Plot ==
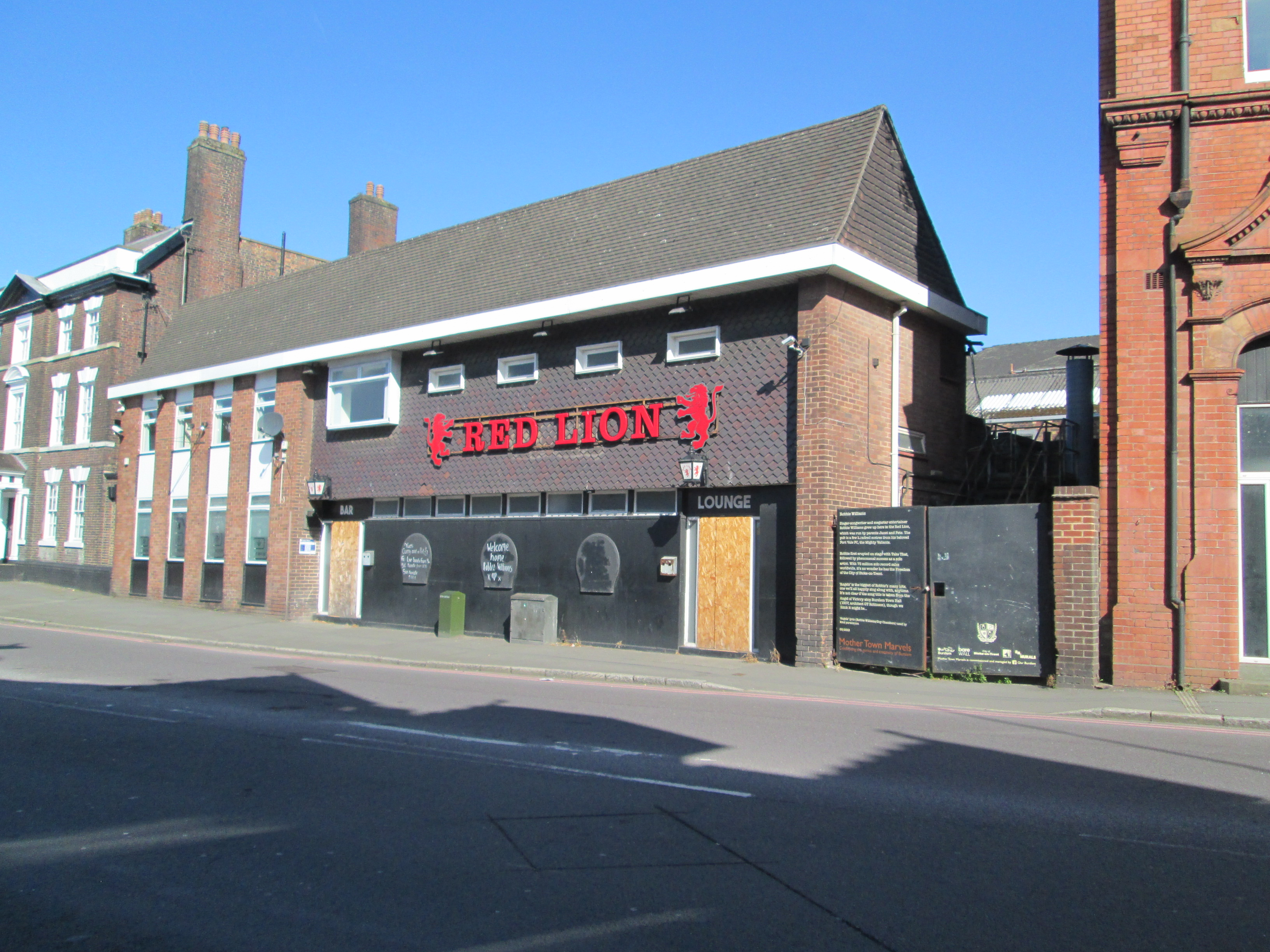
The opening of the film depicts the Williams' former home, a Burslem pub called the Red Lion.

In 1982, in Stoke-on-Trent, eight-year-old Robert Williams is shamed as a loser in the playground. At home, he eagerly emulates his father, Peter, a police constable and aspiring entertainer who idolises Frank Sinatra. Robert inherits his father's fear of being a "nobody", but Betty, his doting grandmother, encourages Robert to be true to himself.

In a youth production of The Pirates of Penzance, Robert's showboating overcomes his stage fright and wins over the audience, but, shaken by impostor syndrome, he imagines an inner critic who vilifies and threatens himself. Skipping Robert's play, Peter wins a talent show prize, emboldening him to walk out on his family and change his name to pursue stardom. Forced to move out with his mother, Robert salvages the comb that his father used to teach him a preshow ritual ("Feel").

In 1990, Robert writes amateur lyrics and single-mindedly chases fame, in contrast to his friend Nate, who turns down a talent tryout. Robert enters a boy band audition in Manchester, failing to impress manager Nigel Martin-Smith with his outdated traditional pop, but puts on a swagger which earns him a place. Elated when Peter reconnects with him, Robert is further inspired by watching his father perform. He meets his new bandmates in Take That, including Gary Barlow, already a prodigious child entertainer and songwriter. Martin-Smith dubs him "Robbie", prompting him to invent a celebrity persona, despite Betty's disapproval.

Robbie finds acceptance and liberation during the band's unprofitable stint playing gay clubs. They achieve overwhelming success with teenage girl audiences, even as Robbie's inner critics return, growing in number and malevolence ("I Found Heaven"). This newfound fandom earns the band a record deal in London, and they raucously parade through Regent Street in celebration ("Rock DJ"). Robbie rebels against being subordinate to Gary, but cannot measure up to him in talent—even in Peter's eyes—and falls into depression. After Gary replaces Robbie on lead vocals for "Relight My Fire", Robbie brazenly steals back the lead vocals during Take That's biggest concert ever in Manchester during the Pop Tour (1994–95), despite nearly sabotaging the show with his substance abuse. He is finally fired in July 1995 for his volatility and insubordination, and becomes blamed for the band's subsequent breakup. He resolves to start a solo career in revenge ("Come Undone").

Robbie kindles a romance with fellow celebrity singer Nicole Appleton of All Saints; they become engaged and plan parenthood, but Nicole relents to her manager's demand to terminate the pregnancy ("She's the One"), leading to bitter recrimination from Robbie. While Nicole celebrates "Never Ever" charting at number one, Robbie leaves to rub elbows with his idols, the Gallagher brothers, who disdainfully boast of headlining the Knebworth Festival as their crowning achievement.

Producer and songwriter Guy Chambers dismisses Robbie's superficial pop songs, but discovers the potential in his lyrics inspired by personal loss ("Something Beautiful"). Hellbent on playing Knebworth, Robbie launches his solo career, embarking on frenetic touring alongside rampant philandering and alcohol and cocaine use.

His fame skyrocketing, Robbie duets with Tom Jones at the Brit Awards ("Land of 1000 Dances") and is finally booked to headline Knebworth, but fear and addiction drive him to emotional lows. His wilful downward spiral and infidelity alienate Nicole, who breaks off their engagement. Moments before a Top of the Pops performance, Robbie learns that he has missed Betty's passing, after her succumbing to dementia ("Angels"). Trashing his own mansion in grief, Robbie falls out with Nate, who has long put up with an unreciprocated friendship. Having learned that Peter only reconnected with him at Betty's request, Robbie denounces his father (a small-time entertainer and backstage guest) as an opportunist and asks him: "You've always been there for 'Robbie' Williams. Why couldn't you just be there for Robert?"

On stage at Knebworth before a record-breaking audience, Robbie's self-loathing manifests as a bloodthirsty mob of inner critics, taking the forms of his past selves, young and old. As the imaginary mob swarms the stage, he massacres them in an all-out melee, leaving only a mirror image of his present-day self, whom he attempts to kill by slitting his own wrist ("Let Me Entertain You").

Suddenly alone on a frozen lake, Robbie is stopped by a ray of sunlight evoking Betty's memory. Robbie enters rehab, admitting, at a group session, that becoming famous has stunted his maturity and growth. He apologises to Gary, amicably parts with Nicole, reconciles with Nate, and moves past his grief at Betty's grave ("Better Man"). At the Royal Albert Hall, Robbie invites his father onstage in a duet of Sinatra's "My Way", in mutual respect and admiration. Robbie's past selves look on, no longer in criticism but approval, as he concludes the song by honoring Betty.

== Cast ==
- Robbie Williams as himself (narrator, vocals)
  - Jonno Davies as Robbie Williams (voice and motion capture)
  - Adam Tucker provides additional singing vocals for Robbie
  - Carter J. Murphy provides the voice of young Robbie
- Steve Pemberton as Peter Williams/Conway, Robbie's father
- Kate Mulvany as Janet Williams, Robbie's mother
- Alison Steadman as Betty Williams, Robbie's grandmother
- Damon Herriman as Nigel Martin-Smith, the band manager of Take That
- Raechelle Banno as Nicole Appleton, a member of All Saints and Robbie's fiancée
  - Kayleigh McKnight provides additional singing vocals for Nicole
- Karina Banno as Natalie Appleton, Nicole's sister and a member of All Saints
- Jake Simmance as Gary Barlow, a member of Take That
- Liam Head as Howard Donald, a member of Take That
- Jesse Hyde as Mark Owen, a member of Take That
- Chase Vollenweider as Jason Orange, a member of Take That
- Tom Budge as Guy Chambers, Robbie's songwriting partner
- Leo Harvey-Elledge as Liam Gallagher, the lead singer of Oasis. Harvey-Elledge reprises the role from Creation Stories (2021).
- Chris Gun as Noel Gallagher, lead songwriter of Oasis
- Frazer Hadfield as Nate, Robbie's childhood friend
  - Leatham Blisand as young Nate
- Anthony Hayes as Chris Briggs
- John O'May as Terry Swinton

== Production ==
=== Development ===
The project was announced in February 2021 as co-written and directed by Michael Gracey with Oliver Cole and Simon Gleeson also having co-writing credits, and Gracey also producing alongside Jules Daly for Big Red Films and Craig McMahon for McMahon International. Later that year it was reported that funding also came via the Australian government's Producer Offset and Film Victoria's incentive programmes. The film is distributed in Australia and New Zealand by Roadshow Films with international sales handled by Rocket Science.

Described as a satirical musical, the project was reported to cover three decades of Robbie Williams' stardom, from his first success in the group Take That through the ups and down of his career. The project was reported to "reinterpret and recontextualise" some of his songs. The title Better Man was derived from a song by Williams.

=== Casting ===
Williams described the filming process as "super odd" because he would find himself sitting "in make-up and the lady that's playing your grandma is sitting next to you, and the people playing your mum and dad". Williams is portrayed and voiced by Jonno Davies as a CGI chimpanzee using motion-capture technology. Carter J. Murphy was cast as the child version of Williams. Williams narrates and voices his character in the final scene. While Williams re-recorded many of his songs, Adam Tucker provided additional vocals, including "My Way" and "She's the One" (with Kayleigh McKnight).

Other cast members include Steve Pemberton, Alison Steadman, Anthony Hayes, Damon Herriman and Kate Mulvany, with Williams' Take That bandmates played by Jake Simmance (Barlow), Liam Head (Donald), Jesse Hyde (Owen) and Chase Vollenweider (Orange). Visual effects were provided by Wētā FX, leveraging the studio's experience animating chimpanzees for the Planet of the Apes reboot film series.

=== Filming ===
Gracey wanted to tell the story from the perspective of how Williams saw himself. As Williams often described himself as a "performing monkey", he suggested depicting him as a chimpanzee. Williams said: "I've been a cheeky monkey all my life. There's no more cheekier monkey than the coke-snorting, sex-addict monkey that we find in the movie." He also saw it as a way to avoid the distraction of an actor playing him, with audiences constantly assessing the performance and resemblance. Gracey said: "It desensitises and sensitises you all at the same time. We have deep empathy and compassion for animals, way more than we do for humans." No explanation for his appearance as a chimpanzee is given in the film. As Williams did not want to leave his family for months of filming, he only performed motion capture for the final scene, when he performs "My Way".

Principal photography took place at the Docklands Studios Melbourne, in May and June 2022. For the Royal Albert Hall concert as depicted in the finale, while stage shots were filmed in Melbourne, audience reactions were filmed later using a real, on-location audience—guided by audiovisual prompts—when Williams revisited the venue in actual concert on 6 and 7 November 2022. Members of the public were able to purchase bargain price tickets to attend in evening dress, while other seats were reserved for filming certain shots. Due to an inebriated audience on 6 November, the crew relied on the 7 November concert to obtain a usable take.

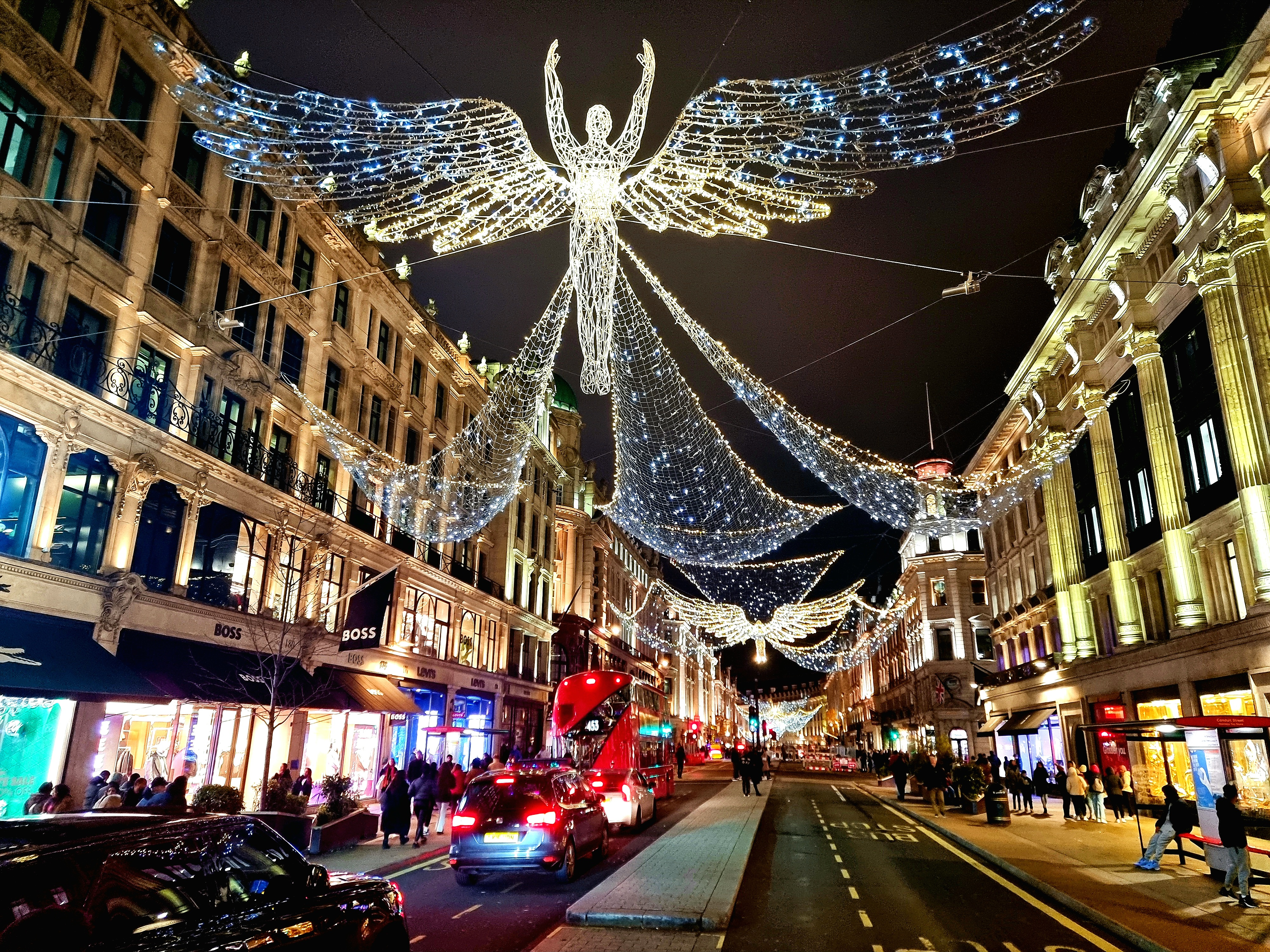
Special effects in the film include an anachronistic, period-appropriate version of the "Spirit of Christmas" light sculptures seen on Regent Street, which did not exist in the 1990s.

The Regent Street musical sequence, which included 500 dancers, was filmed on-location in March 2023; the shoot, which required the street and all businesses to be shut down for four nights, was originally planned for September 2022, but was delayed to 2023 due to the death and state funeral of Elizabeth II, followed by the street being decorated for Christmas season. Filming also took place in Krnjača, between Belgrade and Pančevo, Serbia.

=== Effects ===
The on-location Regent Street footage was altered to replace modern-day LED signs with period-appropriate 1990s signage. However, as a deliberate anachronism, the seasonal "Spirit of Christmas" angel light sculptures, which were introduced to Regent Street only in 2016, were digitally inserted as an element of the dance sequence, again using period-appropriate incandescent bulbs.

Because the Knebworth Festival scene is intercut with actual archive footage of the 2003 festival, Wētā needed to accurately recreate the concert lighting design. Lighting control files were obtained from the concert lighting operator. A spatial simulation of the concert lighting rig was created, allowing the files to be imported to control the simulated lights.

== Music ==
Better Man (Original Motion Picture Soundtrack)

Soundtrack album by Robbie Williams
- Released: 27 December 2024
- Length: 52:04
- Label: Sony Music Entertainment UK

Robbie Williams chronology
XXV (2022)	Better Man (Original Motion Picture Soundtrack) (2024)	Britpop (2026)

Singles from Better Man (Original Motion Picture Soundtrack)
- 1. "Forbidden Road" Released: 22 November 2024

=== Original Motion Picture Soundtrack by Robbie Williams ===
Songs performed by Williams in the film include "She's the One", "Angels" and "Let Me Entertain You". Gracey stated that the songs would be "re-sung", to suit "the emotion of the moment" in the film. The original score was composed by Batu Sener. On 22 November 2024, Williams released the single "Forbidden Road", taken from the film's soundtrack; it peaked at number 20 on the UK Singles Downloads Chart.

The soundtrack album to Better Man was released on 27 December 2024. On 3 January 2025, the album debuted at number 1 on the UK Albums Downloads Chart and at number 4 on the UK Soundtrack Albums Chart. After its release on physical formats, the album debuted at number 1 on the UK Albums Chart, giving Williams his fifteenth number 1 album and thus equalling the record for most number one albums with the Beatles.

Track listing

No.	Title	Writer(s)	Performed by	Length
1.	"Feel"	Williams; Guy Chambers	Carter Murphy and Steve Pemberton	3:00
2.	"I Found Heaven"	Ian Levine; Billy Griffin	Robbie Williams, Adam Tucker, and Tom Bales	3:02
3.	"Rock DJ"	Williams; Chambers; Kelvin Andrews; Nelson Pigford; Ekundayo Paris	Robbie Williams	4:01
4.	"Relight My Fire"	Dan Hartman	Robbie Williams, Adam Tucker, and Tom Bales	2:36
5.	"Come Undone"	Williams; Boots Ottestad; Ashley Hamilton; Daniel Pierre	Robbie Williams and Adam Tucker	3:08
6.	"She's the One"	Karl Wallinger	Robbie Williams, Adam Tucker, and Kayleigh McKnight	4:17
7.	"Something Beautiful"	Williams; Chambers	Robbie Williams	4:01
8.	"Land of 1000 Dances"	Chris Kenner	Robbie Williams and Adam Tucker	4:05
9.	"Angels"	Williams; Chambers	Robbie Williams and Adam Tucker	5:29
10.	"Let Me Entertain You"	Williams; Chambers	Robbie Williams	3:38
11.	"Better Man"	Williams; Chambers	Robbie Williams and Adam Tucker	4:20
12.	"My Way"	Jacques Revaux; Gilles Thibaut; Claude François; Paul Anka	Robbie Williams, Adam Tucker, and Steve Pemberton	7:04
13.	"Forbidden Road"	Sacha Skarbek; Freddy Wexler; Williams	Robbie Williams	3:17
Total length:				51:58

==== Charts ====
Chart performance for Better Man
Chart (2025)	Peak position
Australian Albums (ARIA)	5
Austrian Albums (Ö3 Austria)	36
Belgian Albums (Ultratop Flanders)	168
German Albums (Offizielle Top 100)	3
Greek Albums (IFPI)	69
Irish Albums (Official Charts)	1
Swiss Albums (Schweizer Hitparade)	58
UK Albums (Official Charts)	1
UK Soundtrack Albums (Official Charts)	1

=== Original Motion Picture Score by Batu Sener ===
The score album, composed and produced by Batu Sener, distributed by Crashington Music (under exclusive license from Better Man PTY and Farrell Music) was released on 24 October 2025, includes 21 tracks with alternate versions of certain tracks:

Better Man (Original Motion Picture Score)

Soundtrack album by Batu Sener
- Released: 24 October 2025
- Length: 37:35
- Label: Crashington Music

Track Listing
No.	Title	Composer	Length
1.	Better Man Score Suite	Batu Sener	6:19
2.	Better Man Expanded Suite	Batu Sener	2:40
3.	The Story Starts	Batu Sener	0:36
4.	Face Plant (Film Version)	Batu Sener	0:54
5.	Born With It	Batu Sener	1:28
6.	Finding Your Own Gods	Batu Sener	1:26
7.	The Audition	Batu Sener	0:42
8.	Youth?	Batu Sener	1:04
9.	Call from Dad (Film Version)	Batu Sener	0:56
10.	Learn from the Best	Batu Sener	1:27
11.	Recording Studio	Batu Sener	1:16
12.	How Can You Not Know?	Batu Sener	1:28
13.	Watermelon Kicked Out	Batu Sener	1:13
14.	Underwater Demons	Batu Sener	1:34
15.	Hundred-Thousand Door Slams	Batu Sener	1:14
16.	The Break Up	Batu Sener	2:26
17.	Downfall	Batu Sener	1:26
18.	Just Not For Me	Batu Sener	1:41
19.	Battle of the Ice Demons	Batu Sener	5:14
20.	Suicide Lake (Film Version)	Batu Sener	1:31
21.	Little Robbie (Solo Piano)	Batu Sener	1:01

== Release ==
Better Man premiered at the Telluride Film Festival and was also screened at the Toronto International Film Festival on 10 September 2024. Additionally, the film opened the 55th International Film Festival of India on 20 November 2024.

The film was theatrically released on 26 December 2024 in Australia by Roadshow Films and in the United Kingdom by Entertainment Film Distributors. It had a limited theatrical release by Paramount Pictures in the United States on 25 December, before a wider release on 10 January 2025. On why Paramount chose to acquire the film, Vulture reports that the studio faced a depleted release slate for the period due to the impact of the COVID-19 lockdowns and the recent Hollywood strikes, though Comscore senior media analyst Paul Dergarabedian speculated that the film may gradually find momentum on home video through positive word-of-mouth, pointing out the film's bizarre premise as a selling point.

== Reception ==
=== Box office ===
Better Man grossed $2 million in the United States and Canada, and $20.5 million in other territories (including a "tepid" $8.5 million and $3.3 million in the UK and Australia, respectively), for a worldwide total of $22.5 million. Produced independently on a budget of 198 million NZD (roughly $110 million) — with Paramount paying an additional $25 million for distribution rights — the movie was deemed a huge financial failure and ranked as among the biggest box-office bombs of all time. Several sources cited Williams' lack of success in the U.S. as opposed to countries such as his native UK and Australia.

In the United States and Canada, Better Man had a limited release for two weeks before expanding into a wide release in its third weekend, where it was projected to gross $2 million from 1,291 theaters. The film debuted at $1.1 million, finishing outside the box office top 10. The box office in North America was attributed to Williams' obscurity there. (Note: Attributed to multiple references:) However, Deadline Hollywood noted that the film was bound to fail in the US since it had failed to perform well even in Williams' native United Kingdom. It performed more poorly than films playing on far fewer screens, including The Brutalist ($1.38 million from 68 theatres) and The Last Showgirl ($1.53 million from 870 theaters).

Aware of Williams' obscurity in North America while making the film, Gracey had attempted to counter the problem by portraying Williams as a primate, hoping the film would resonate with American audiences.

=== Viewership ===
Following the release of the film onto DVD and on digital download sites in April 2025, Better Man debuted at number 3 on the UK DVD Chart (spending a total of 17 weeks on that chart) and peaked at number 8 on the UK Film Chart.

=== Critical response ===
On the review aggregator website Rotten Tomatoes, 89% of 227 critics' reviews are positive, with an average rating of 7.4/10. The website's consensus reads: "Daring to substitute its marquee star with a VFX creation and somehow pulling it off, Better Man makes a monkey out of the traditional musical biopic to thrilling effect." Metacritic, which uses a weighted average, assigned the film a score of 77 out of 100, based on 42 critics, indicating "generally favorable" reviews. Audiences polled by PostTrak gave the film an 83% overall positive score, with 63% saying they would "definitely recommend" it.

Clint Worthington of RogerEbert.com awarded the film 4 out of 4 stars. He praised the pacing, musical sequences, and inventiveness, writing that using an ape to portray Williams delivered a "curveball" away from routine musical biopic tropes. In a 3 1/2 out of 4 star review for The Washington Post, Michael Andor Brodeur thought the CGI ape was "astonishingly expressive and strangely disarming" recounting Williams' journey. Benjamin Lee of The Guardian gave it 4 stars: "an unlikely yet surprisingly entertaining saga" and "a bananas gamble." Jeannette Catsoulis of The New York Times commended the film for capturing Williams' vulnerabilities with addiction, insecurity, and relationships: "Neither hagiography nor hatchet job, the movie casts an understanding eye on a once-infamous musical artist who weathered dizzying highs and devastating lows".

Gregory Ellwood of The Playlist liked the "jukebox musical" "with a twist", grading C+, yet wrote "the human element is increasingly absent." He wanted the ape "to transform into the real Williams or an actor...someone real to bring [his] life story back to earth." Alan Zilberman of Spectrum Culture wrote the film had "some interesting conceits", yet it "devolves into a loop of toxic behaviour and self-destruction." He disliked "the repetitive nature of Williams' relapses." Kevin Maher of The Times thought it was a self-aggrandizing and vapid recounting of Williams' career. He wrote that Williams' "decision to cast himself as an 'unevolved' monkey buys him a licence to litter the rest of the movie with tedious therapy-speak, a phoney yearning for acceptance (even as he nurtures delusions of divine grandeur) and a mother lode of narcissistic victimhood". Wendy Ide of The Guardian gave it four stars, writing the tone had "a precarious balance between wry self-deprecation and maudlin self-pity." She thought the story was "pretty generic" with emotions "hammered home with piledriver subtlety", yet liked the "humour, mischief and a sparky, unpredictable anarchy."

Filmmakers Tim Fehlbaum and Drew Goddard both cited Better Man as among their favorite films of 2024, with Fehlbaum saying "This concept is so anarchic and wild that it's hard to put into words how this film works; you have to see it to believe it. Michael Gracey has just created one of the best music biographical films of all time, certainly the most original." Comedian Taylor Tomlinson dedicated a segment of her comedy panel game show After Midnight to praising Better Man.

=== Accolades ===
The song "Forbidden Road" was nominated for Best Original Song at the 82nd Golden Globe Awards. It was initially shortlisted for the Academy Award for Best Original Song at the 97th Academy Awards, but was disqualified a few days later after it was found it incorporated material from another song. The film was only nominated for Best Visual Effects.

Better Man received a record-breaking 16 nominations at the 2025 AACTA Awards, winning in nine categories, including Best Film. It was nominated in four categories at the 23rd Visual Effects Society Awards for Outstanding Visual Effects in a Photoreal Feature, Outstanding Character in a Photoreal Feature, Outstanding Compositing and Lighting in a Feature, and Outstanding Virtual Cinematography in a CG Project. It also received a nomination for Best Special Visual Effects at the 78th British Academy Film Awards.

Year	Award	Category	Nominee	Result	Ref.
2025	Golden Globe Awards	Best Original Song	"Forbidden Road"	Nominated	
2025	Visual Effects Society Awards	Outstanding Visual Effects in a Photoreal Feature	Better Man	Nominated	
2025	Visual Effects Society Awards	Outstanding Animated Character in a Photoreal Feature	Robbie Williams	Won	
2025	Visual Effects Society Awards	Outstanding Compositing & Lighting in a Feature	Better Man	Nominated	
2025	Visual Effects Society Awards	Outstanding Virtual Cinematography in a CG Project	Better Man	Nominated	
2025	AACTA Awards	Best Film	Better Man	Won	
2025	AACTA Awards	Best Direction	Michael Gracey	Won	
2025	AACTA Awards	Best Screenplay	Simon Gleeson, Oliver Cole, and Michael Gracey	Won	
2025	AACTA Awards	Best Lead Actor	Jonno Davies	Won	
2025	AACTA Awards	Best Supporting Actor	Damon Herriman	Won	
2025	AACTA Awards	Best Supporting Actress	Kate Mulvany	Nominated	
2025	AACTA Awards	Best Cinematography	Erik A. Wilson, Matt Toll, and Ashley Wallen	Nominated	
2025	AACTA Awards	Best Editing	Martin Connor, Lee Smith, Spencer Susser, Jeff Groth, and Patrick Correll	Won	
2025	AACTA Awards	Best Original Music Score	Batu Sener	Won	
2025	AACTA Awards	Best Sound	Paul Pirola, Guntis Sics, Greg P. Russell, Tom Marks, Andy Nelson, Tim Ryan	Nominated	
2025	AACTA Awards	Best Production Design	Joel Chang	Nominated	
2025	AACTA Awards	Best Costume Design	Cappi Ireland	Nominated	
2025	AACTA Awards	Best Casting	Alison Telford, Kate Leonard, and Kate Dowd	Won	
2025	British Academy Film Awards	Best Special Visual Effects	Luke Millar, David Clayton, Keith Herft, and Peter Stubbs	Nominated	
2025	Academy Awards	Best Visual Effects	Luke Millar, David Clayton, Keith Herft, and Peter Stubbs	Nominated	
2025	Crystal Pine Awards	Best Original Score	Batu Sener	Nominated	
2025	AWGIE Awards	Feature Film – Original	Michael Gracey, Oliver Cole, and Simon Gleeson	Nominated	

== See also ==
- Cinema of Australia
