= Michael Gracey =

Australian director (born 1976)

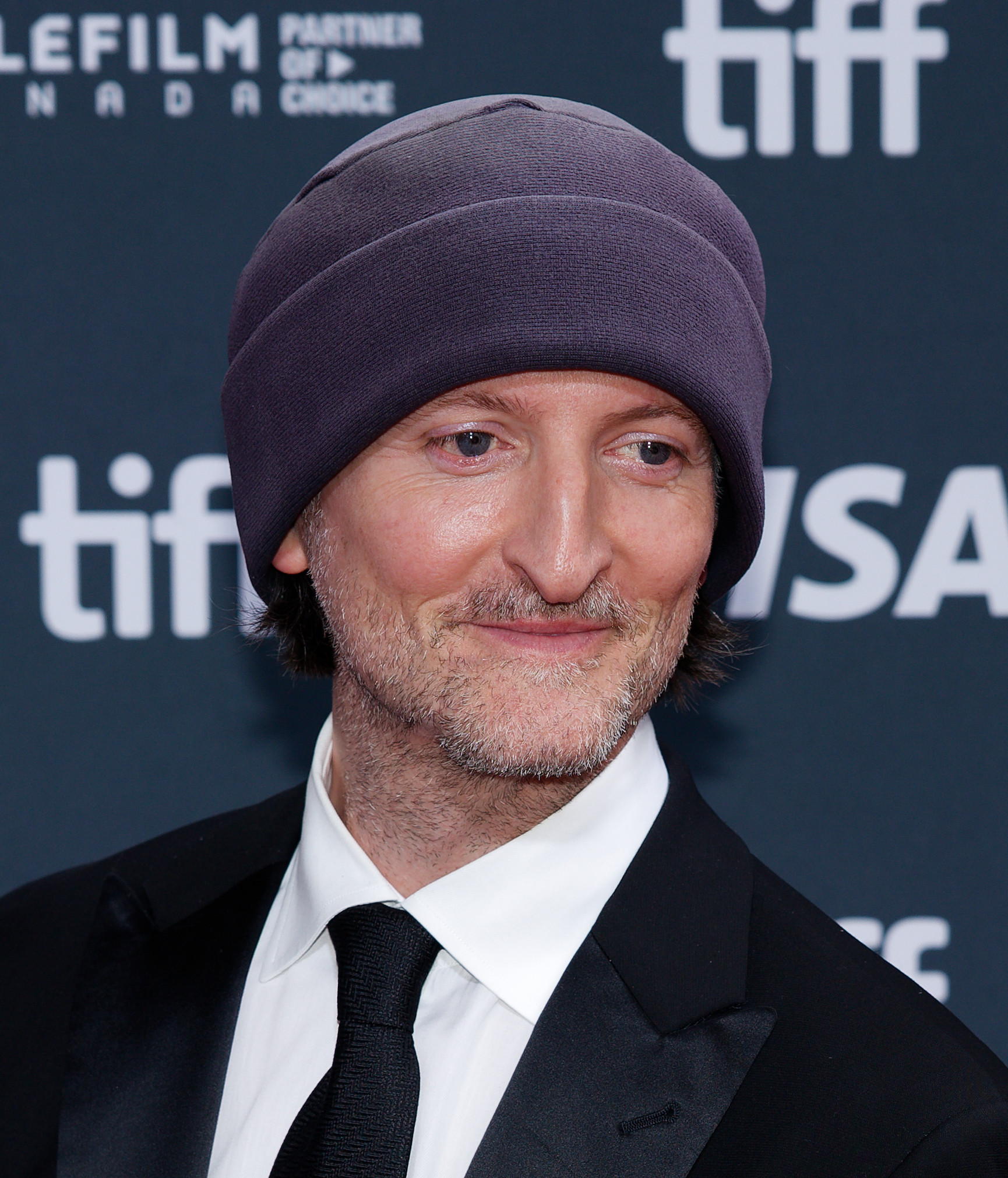
- Gracey at the 2024 Toronto International Film Festival
- Occupation: Filmmaker
- Years active: 1997–present
- Notable work: The Greatest Showman (2017); Better Man (2024)

Michael Gracey is an Australian filmmaker. He is best known for directing the films The Greatest Showman and Better Man.

== Early life and career ==
Gracey grew up in Melbourne – in Carlton then Kew – then started working in visual effects and music videos before making his reputation in advertising, gaining a name for himself with his Christmas commercials in the UK and US.

Gracey worked for two years at animation and visual effects studio Animal Logic from 1994 to 1996 as an animator and visual effects compositor. He left the company to work at Complete Post, during which time Gracey met and began working with director Baz Luhrmann, who invited him to work on Moulin Rouge!. "We worked on what we called 'visual scrapbooks'," Gracey told shots.net. "Baz would shoot some footage of Nicole Kidman singing or something and we'd do little mock-ups, and cut mood reels together."

== Career ==
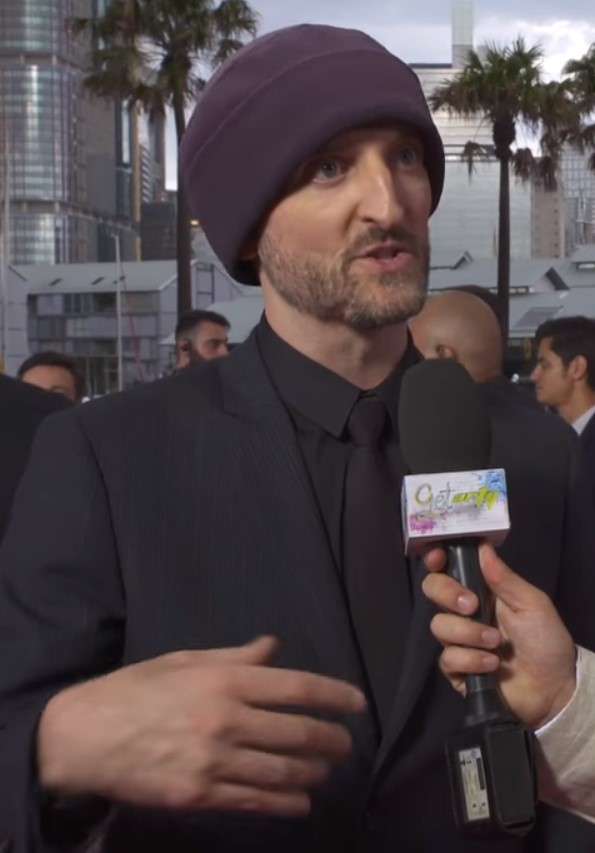
Gracey at the premiere of The Greatest Showman Australian

Gracey made his feature directorial debut in 2017 with The Greatest Showman starring Hugh Jackman as P. T. Barnum.

Gracey was also slated to direct an adaptation of manga series Naruto, but was replaced by Destin Daniel Cretton, and an adaptation of the novel Daughter of Smoke and Bone, which fell in development hell.

In 2022, Gracey directed a short film for Tourism Australia, G'Day, starring Rose Byrne and Will Arnett, with cameos from Hamish Blake & Andy Lee. The commercial is the salient feature of the 'Come and Say G’day' campaign.

Gracey is a member of the Australian production company: FINCH.

Gracey directed the Robbie Williams biopic Better Man.

Gracey is COO of the recently formed entertainment company Gracey&CO. He is doing this alongside his sister Cassandra Gracey, who has had a successful career in the Music Industry managing the likes of Ellie Goulding, Rita Ora and Simon Cowell's recently formed band December 10 - who formed off the back of his Netflix documentary "Simon Cowell: The Next Act."

In 2026, Gacey directed an ad campaign for South Korean video surveillance company Hanwha Vision for their new "Proactive Vision Intelligence" product featuring Amanda Seyfried.

== Filmography ==
Visual effects

Year	Title	Notes
1997	Amy	Digital artist
1998	The Genie from Down Under	Visual effects artist (6 episodes)
2001	Cubbyhouse	Digital compositor
2002	Double Vision	Digital compositor
2003	Ned Kelly	Digital compositor – Complete Post; Visual effects supervisor – Complete 2003 Post
2005	The Magician	Visual effects supervisor

Director

Year	Title	Director	Producer	Writer	Notes
2017	The Greatest Showman	Yes	No	No	
2021	Pink: All I Know So Far	Yes	Yes	Yes	Documentary film
2024	Better Man	Yes	Yes	Yes	
2028	Tangled	Yes	No	No	Filming

Executive producer

Year	Title	Notes
2019	Rocketman	Originally attached to direct the film before being replaced by Dexter Fletcher
2023	Ladybug & Cat Noir: The Movie	Also song lyrics

Special thanks

- The Square (2008)
