= XXV Tour =

2022–23 concert tour by Robbie Williams

- Tour by Robbie Williams
- Promotional poster for the tour
- Location: Asia; Europe; North America; Oceania
- Associated album: XXV
- Start date: 9 October 2022
- End date: 8 December 2023
- No. of shows: 80

Robbie Williams concert chronology
- The Heavy Entertainment Show Tour (2017–18); XXV Tour (2022–23); Britpop Tour (2025–26)

The XXV Tour was the thirteenth concert tour by the English singer and songwriter Robbie Williams, in support of his 2022 compilation album XXV, which features newly recorded and orchestrated versions of songs from throughout his career. The tour began at The O2 Arena in London, England on October 9, 2022 and concluded at the Planai-Stadion in Schladming, Austria on December 8, 2023. It is Williams' longest-lasting tour, composing of 80 dates.

The UK and Ireland leg of the tour was first announced on June 13, 2022, with the Oceania leg announced on September 21, 2022 and the European leg on September 26, 2022. The tour was Williams' first since The Heavy Entertainment Show Tour, which took place in 2017–2018, and his first to mainly compose of indoor arena and festival shows since the Let Me Entertain You Tour in 2015.

== Tour dates ==
List of 2022 concerts
Date (2022)	City	Country	Venue	Opening acts	Attendance	Revenue
9 October	London	England	The O2 Arena	Lufthaus	31,627 / 31,627	$3,519,958
10 October	London	England	The O2 Arena	Lufthaus	31,627 / 31,627	$3,519,958
15 October	Birmingham	England	Resorts World Arena	Lufthaus	—	—
16 October	Birmingham	England	Resorts World Arena	Lufthaus	—	—
19 October	Manchester	England	AO Arena	Lufthaus	40,753 / 40,753	$3,815,312
21 October	Manchester	England	AO Arena	Lufthaus	40,753 / 40,753	$3,815,312
22 October	Manchester	England	AO Arena	Lufthaus	40,753 / 40,753	$3,815,312
24 October	Glasgow	Scotland	OVO Hydro	Lufthaus	27,708 / 28,746	$2,613,055
25 October	Glasgow	Scotland	OVO Hydro	Lufthaus	27,708 / 28,746	$2,613,055
26 October	Glasgow	Scotland	OVO Hydro	Lufthaus	27,708 / 28,746	$2,613,055
29 October	Dublin	Ireland	3Arena	Lufthaus	34,529 / 36,273	$3,116,413
30 October	Dublin	Ireland	3Arena	Lufthaus	34,529 / 36,273	$3,116,413
1 November	Dublin	Ireland	3Arena	Lufthaus	34,529 / 36,273	$3,116,413

List of 2023 concerts
Date (2023)	City	Country	Venue	Opening acts	Attendance	Revenue
20 January	Bologna	Italy	Unipol Arena	Lufthaus	—	—
21 January	Bologna	Italy	Unipol Arena	Lufthaus	—	—
26 January	Antwerp	Belgium	Sportpaleis	Lufthaus	—	—
28 January	Amsterdam	Netherlands	Ziggo Dome	Lufthaus	—	—
29 January	Amsterdam	Netherlands	Ziggo Dome	Lufthaus	—	—
1 February	Hamburg	Germany	Barclays Arena	Lufthaus	—	—
2 February	Hamburg	Germany	Barclays Arena	Lufthaus	—	—
5 February	Cologne	Germany	Lanxess Arena	Lufthaus	42,600 / 49,254	$5,273,949
6 February	Cologne	Germany	Lanxess Arena	Lufthaus	42,600 / 49,254	$5,273,949
8 February	Cologne	Germany	Lanxess Arena	Lufthaus	42,600 / 49,254	$5,273,949
13 February	Amsterdam	Netherlands	Ziggo Dome	Lufthaus	—	—
15 February	Frankfurt	Germany	Festhalle Frankfurt	Lufthaus	—	—
16 February	Frankfurt	Germany	Festhalle Frankfurt	Lufthaus	—	—
20 February	Berlin	Germany	Uber Arena	Lufthaus	—	—
21 February	Berlin	Germany	Uber Arena	Lufthaus	—	—
24 February	Hamburg	Germany	Barclays Arena	Lufthaus	—	—
26 February	Herning	Denmark	Jyske Bank Boxen	Lufthaus	—	—
27 February	Copenhagen	Denmark	Royal Arena	Lufthaus	—	—
1 March	Stockholm	Sweden	Avicii Arena	Lufthaus	—	—
5 March	Tampere	Finland	Nokia Arena	Lufthaus	—	—
9 March	Riga	Latvia	Arena Riga	Lufthaus	—	—
10 March	Kaunas	Lithuania	Žalgirio Arena	Lufthaus	—	—
12 March	Kraków	Poland	Tauron Arena Kraków	Lufthaus	—	—
14 March	Budapest	Hungary	László Papp Budapest Sports Arena	Lufthaus	—	—
16 March	Vienna	Austria	Wiener Stadthalle	Lufthaus	30,347 / 30,347	$4,024,582
17 March	Vienna	Austria	Wiener Stadthalle	Lufthaus	30,347 / 30,347	$4,024,582
20 March	Paris	France	Accor Arena	Lufthaus	16,670 / 16,850	$1,476,172
24 March	Barcelona	Spain	Palau Sant Jordi	Lufthaus	33,456 / 35,374	$3,291,658
25 March	Barcelona	Spain	Palau Sant Jordi	Lufthaus	33,456 / 35,374	$3,291,658
27 March	Lisbon	Portugal	MEO Arena	Lufthaus	15,450 / 15,982	$1,415,759
14 May (Note: This show was part of Tecate Emblema.)	Mexico City	Mexico	Autódromo Hermanos Rodríguez	—N/a	—N/a	—N/a
28 May (Note: This show was part of North Music Festival.)	Porto	Portugal	Porto Convention Centre	—N/a	—N/a	—N/a
1 June (Note: This show was part of Summer in the City Tel Aviv.)	Tel Aviv	Israel	Yarkon Park	—N/a	—N/a	—N/a
10 June (Note: This show was part of Heartland Festival.)	Funen	Denmark	Egeskov Castle Grounds	—N/a	—N/a	—N/a
15 June 2023	Fuengirola	Spain	Marenostrum Castle Park	Lufthaus	—	—
17 June (Note: This show was part of Pinkpop Festival.)	Landgraaf	Netherlands	Megaland	—N/a	—N/a	—N/a
18 June (Note: This show was part of Isle of Wight Festival.)	Newport	England	Seaclose Park	—N/a	—N/a	—N/a
22 June (Note: This show was part of Bergen Calling.)	Bergen	Norway	Bergenhus Fortress	—N/a	—N/a	—N/a
24 June	Oslo	Norway	Unity Arena	Lufthaus	—	—
27 June	Pula	Croatia	Pula Arena	—	—	—
28 June	Pula	Croatia	Pula Arena	—	—	—
1 July (Note: This show was part of Rockwave Festival.)	Malakasa	Greece	TerraVibe Park	—N/a	—N/a	—N/a
6 July (Note: This show was part of Mad Cool.)	Madrid	Spain	Villaverde	—N/a	—N/a	—N/a
8 July	Santiago de Compostela	Spain	Monte do Gozo	—N/a	—N/a	—N/a
10 July (Note: The shows in Luxembourg were part of the Luxexpo Open Air series of concerts.)	Luxembourg	Luxembourg	Luxexpo The Box	—N/a	—N/a	—N/a
11 July	Luxembourg	Luxembourg	Luxexpo The Box	—N/a	—N/a	—N/a
13 July (Note: This show was part of Vieilles Charrues Festival.)	Carhaix-Plouguer	France	Kerampuilh	—N/a	—N/a	—N/a
15 July (Note: This show was part of Pori Jazz.)	Pori	Finland	Kirjurinluoto	—N/a	—N/a	—N/a
28 July (Note: This show was part of Lucca Summer Festival.)	Lucca	Italy	Piazza Napoleone	—N/a	—N/a	—N/a
19 August (Note: This show was part of Summer in the City Bucharest.)	Bucharest	Romania	Piața Constituției	—N/a	—N/a	—N/a
22 August (Note: This show was part of Zürich Openair.)	Opfikon	Switzerland	Festivalgelände Glattbrugg	—N/a	—N/a	—N/a
24 August	Floriana	Malta	Fosos	—	—	—
26 August	Sandringham	England	Sandringham Estate	—	—	—
27 August	Sandringham	England	Sandringham Estate	—	—	—
17 September	Singapore		Marina Bay Street Circuit	—N/a	—N/a	—N/a
18 October	Abu Dhabi	United Arab Emirates	Etihad Arena	—	—	—
11 November	Hawke's Bay	New Zealand	Mission Estate Winery	—	—	—
12 November	Hawke's Bay	New Zealand	Mission Estate Winery	—	—	—
16 November	Sydney	Australia	Allianz Stadium	—	36,912 / 37,752	$4,319,592
18 November (Note: This show was part of A Day On The Green.)	Mount Cotton	Australia	Sirromet Wines	—N/a	—N/a	—N/a
19 November	Mount Cotton	Australia	Sirromet Wines	—N/a	—N/a	—N/a
22 November	Melbourne	Australia	AAMI Park	—	58,263 / 60,453	$7,242,345
23 November	Melbourne	Australia	AAMI Park	—	58,263 / 60,453	$7,242,345
25 November	Geelong	Australia	Mt Duneed Estate	—N/a	—N/a	—N/a
1 December	Swan Valley	Australia	Nikola Estate	—N/a	—N/a	—N/a
7 December	Schladming	Austria	Planai-Stadion	—	—	—
8 December	Schladming	Austria	Planai-Stadion	—	—	—

== Cancelled dates ==
List of cancelled concerts, showing date, city, country, venue and reason
Date	City	Country	Venue	Reason	Ref.
23 January 2023	Zürich	Switzerland	Hallenstadion	"Unforeseen circumstances around scheduling issues"	
22 July 2023	Launsdorf	Austria	Hochosterwitz Castle Grounds	Severe weather conditions	
