= Rocket (Robbie Williams song) =

2025 single by Robbie Williams

Single by Robbie Williams

from the album Britpop
- Released: 21 May 2025
- Genre: Britpop · hard rock
- Length: 2:46
- Label: Columbia
- Songwriters: Robert Williams; Karl Brazil; Tom Longworth; Tony Iommi
- Producers: Brazil; Longworth; Sam Miller

Robbie Williams singles chronology
"Forbidden Road" (2024)	"Rocket" (2025)	"Spies" (2025)

"Rocket" is a song by English singer-songwriter Robbie Williams, featuring Tony Iommi (Black Sabbath) and Glenn Hughes (Trapeze, Deep Purple), released as the lead single from Williams' thirteenth studio album, Britpop. On 13 June, a ballad-style reworking of the song, retitled "Pocket Rocket", was released.

== Release and promotion ==
Williams released the single on the same day he announced the forthcoming release of parent album Britpop. A music video, directed by Charlie Lightening, was released on 23 May 2025.

== Commercial performance ==
"Rocket" debuted at number 34 on the UK Singles Downloads Chart and at number 36 on the UK Singles Sales Chart, on 30 May 2025.

== Critical reception ==
Tom Breihan, writing for Stereogum, praised the single, calling it "impressive".

== Charts ==
Chart performance for "Rocket"
Chart (2025)	Peak position
Croatia International Airplay (Top lista)	84
UK Singles Downloads (Official Charts)	34
UK Singles Sales (OCC)	36

== Release history ==
Release dates and formats for "Rocket"
Region	Date	Version	Format(s)	Label(s)	Ref.
Worldwide	21 May 2025	Original	Digital download; streaming	Columbia	
Worldwide	13 June 2025	"Pocket Rocket"	Digital download; streaming	Columbia	
