= The Heavy Entertainment Show Tour =

2017–2018 concert tour by Robbie Williams

- Tour by Robbie Williams
- Promotional poster for the tour
- Location: Europe; North America; Oceania; South America
- Associated album: The Heavy Entertainment Show
- Start date: 2 June 2017
- End date: 17 November 2018
- No. of shows: 47
- Box office: $62 million (Note: 2017 dollars, based on 31 shows.)

Robbie Williams concert chronology
- Let Me Entertain You Tour (2015); The Heavy Entertainment Show Tour (2017–2018); XXV Tour (2022–2023)

The Heavy Entertainment Show Tour was the twelfth concert tour by the English singer and songwriter Robbie Williams, in support of his eleventh studio album The Heavy Entertainment Show, released on 4 November 2016. The tour, first announced on 7 November 2016, began at the Etihad Stadium in Manchester, England on 2 June 2017, traveled thru Europe until September, before landing for shows in Australia and New Zealand in February 2018, until finally concluding with shows in South America and Mexico in November 2018.

== Tour dates ==
List of 2017 concerts
Date (2017)	City	Country	Venue	Opening acts	Attendance	Revenue
2 June	Manchester	England	Etihad Stadium	Erasure	90,173 / 90,173	$8,136,152
3 June	Manchester	England	Etihad Stadium	Erasure	90,173 / 90,173	$8,136,152
6 June	Southampton	England	St Mary's Stadium	Erasure	—	—
9 June	Edinburgh	Scotland	Scottish Gas Murrayfield Stadium	Erasure	—	—
13 June	Coventry	England	Coventry Building Society Arena	Erasure	—	—
17 June	Dublin	Ireland	Aviva Stadium	Erasure	48,623 / 48,623	$4,567,472
21 June	Cardiff	Wales	Principality Stadium	Erasure	—	—
23 June	London	England	London Stadium	Erasure	—	—
26 June	Dresden	Germany	Rudolf-Harbig-Stadion	Erasure	—	—
28 June	Düsseldorf	Germany	Merkur Spiel-Arena	Erasure	—	—
1 July	Paris	France	Accor Arena	Erasure	14,659 / 15,748	$1,385,023
4 July	Nijmegen	Netherlands	Goffertpark	Erasure	60,670 / 60,670	$4,781,805
8 July (Note: This show was part of Werchter Boutique.)	Werchter	Belgium	Werchter Festivalpark	—N/a	—N/a	—N/a
11 July	Hanover	Germany	Heinz-von-Heiden-Arena	Erasure	—	—
14 July	Verona	Italy	Stadio Marcantonio Bentegodi	Erasure	—	—
15 July (Note: This show was part of Lucca Summer Festival.)	Lucca	Italy	Piazza Napoleone	—N/a	—N/a	—N/a
17 July (Note: This show was part of Collisioni Festival.)	Barolo	Italy	Barolo Town Square	—N/a	—N/a	—N/a
19 July	Frankfurt	Germany	Deutsche Bank Park	Erasure	42,869 / 42,869	$9,793,595
22 July	Munich	Germany	Olympiastadion	Erasure	—	—
25 July	Berlin	Germany	Waldbühne	Erasure	38,544 / 44,580	$3,576,231
26 July	Berlin	Germany	Waldbühne	Erasure	38,544 / 44,580	$3,576,231
29 July	Stockholm	Sweden	Tele2 Arena	Erasure	—	—
1 August	Trondheim	Norway	Granåsen	Erasure	—	—
4 August	Bergen	Norway	Bergenhus Fortress	Erasure	—	—
7 August	Copenhagen	Denmark	Parken	Erasure	—	—
10 August	Tampere	Finland	Ratina Stadium	Erasure	—	—
16 August	Vilnius	Lithuania	Vingis Park	Erasure	—	—
19 August	Prague	Czech Republic	Letňany	Erasure	—	—
23 August	Budapest	Hungary	Groupama Aréna	Erasure	—	—
26 August	Vienna	Austria	Ernst-Happel-Stadion	Erasure	—	—
29 August	Klagenfurt	Austria	Wörthersee Stadion	Erasure	—	—
2 September	Zürich	Switzerland	Letzigrund	Erasure	—	—

List of 2018 concerts
Date (2018)	City	Country	Venue	Opening acts	Attendance	Revenue
14 February	Auckland	New Zealand	Spark Arena	Tami Neilson	8,936 / 10,716	$1,088,590
17 February	Dunedin	New Zealand	Forsyth Barr Stadium	Tami Neilson	13,793 / 15,818	$1,611,213
20 February	Brisbane	Australia	Brisbane Entertainment Centre	The Bamboos	11,385 / 11,552	$1,415,471
22 February (Note: This show was part of A Day On The Green.)	Melbourne	Australia	Rochford Winery	Sheppard	—N/a	—N/a
24 February	Melbourne	Australia	Rod Laver Arena	—	23,345 / 25,764	$3,055,495
25 February	Melbourne	Australia	Rod Laver Arena	—	23,345 / 25,764	$3,055,495
28 February	Sydney	Australia	Qudos Bank Arena	The Bamboos	21,686 / 23,510	$2,764,383
1 March	Sydney	Australia	Qudos Bank Arena	The Bamboos	21,686 / 23,510	$2,764,383
3 March (Note: This show was part of A Day On The Green.)	Geelong	Australia	Mt Dundeed Estate	—N/a	—N/a	—N/a
4 March (Note: This show was part of Adelaide 500.)	Adelaide	Australia	Adelaide Street Circuit	—N/a	—N/a	—N/a
7 March	Perth	Australia	RAC Arena	The Bamboos	12,473 / 12,816	$1,467,143
5 November	Santiago	Chile	Movistar Arena	—	—	—
8 November (Note: This show was part of Personal Fest.)	Asunción	Paraguay	Hipódromo de Asunción	—N/a	—N/a	—N/a
15 November	Guadalajara	Mexico	Arena VFG	—	8,983 / 9,848	$652,052
17 November (Note: This show was part of Corona Capital.)	Mexico City	Mexico	Autódromo Hermanos Rodríguez	—N/a	—N/a	—N/a

== Cancelled shows ==
List of cancelled concerts, showing date, city, country, venue and reason
Date	City	Country	Venue	Reason	Ref.
13 August 2017	Warsaw	Poland	PGE Narodowy	Logistical and technical problems	
7 September 2017	Saint Petersburg	Russia	Ice Palace	Illness	
10 September 2017	Moscow	Russia	Olimpiyskiy	Illness	
10 November 2018	Buenos Aires	Argentina	Club Ciudad de Buenos Aires	Severe weather conditions	
