= David Clayton (visual effects) =

Visual effects supervisor

- Occupation: Visual effects artist
- Years active: 2003-present

David Clayton is a visual effects supervisor. He has received three nominations for the Academy Award for Best Visual Effects: for The Hobbit: An Unexpected Journey in 2013, for The Hobbit: The Desolation of Smaug in 2014, and for Better Man in 2025.
