= Cheryl discography =

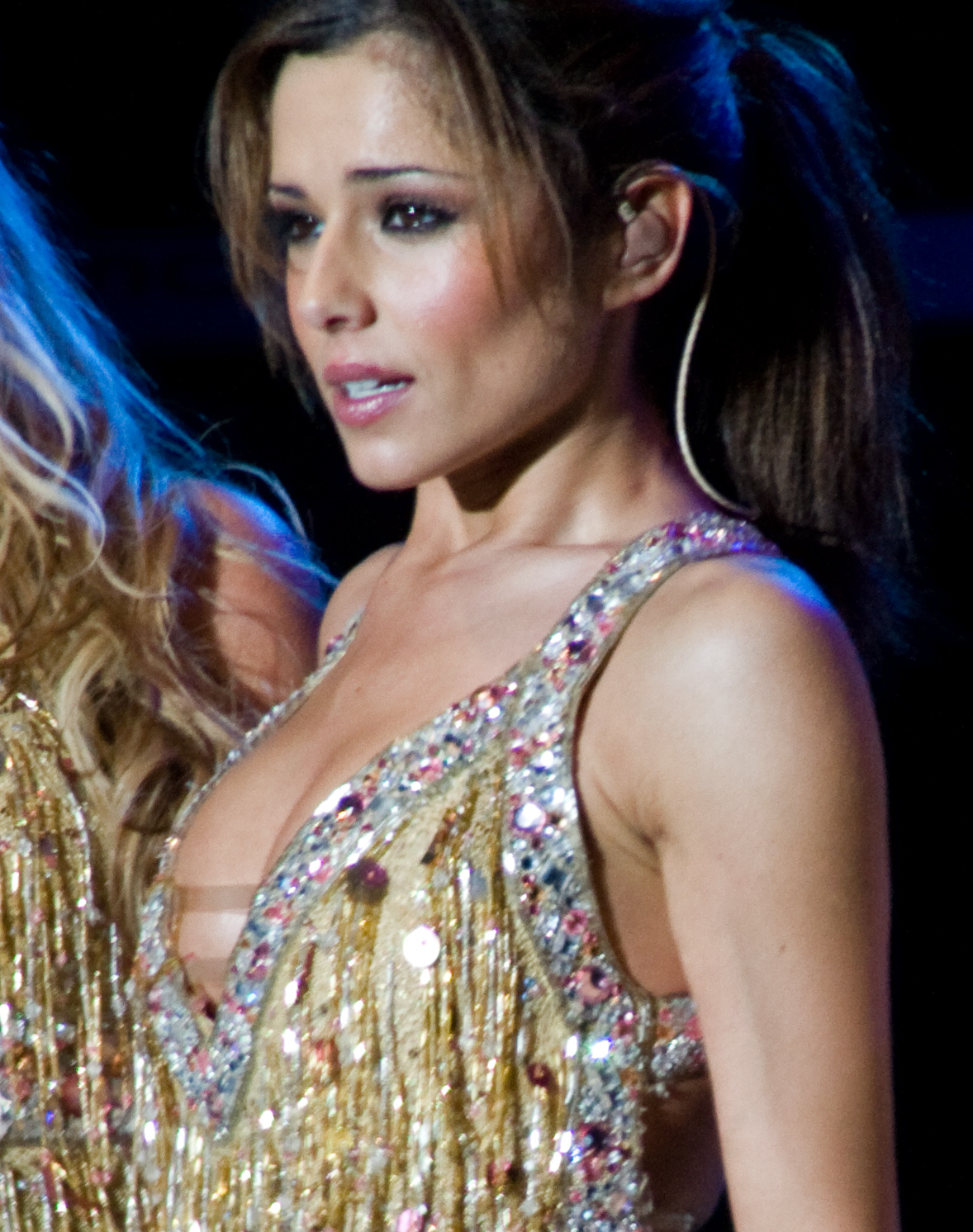
- Cheryl with Girls Aloud in August 2008
- Studio albums: 4
- Extended plays: 1
- Singles: 15
- Music videos: 17

The English singer Cheryl has released four studio albums, one extended play, twelve singles (excluding three as a featured artist), and fourteen music videos. Cheryl's first foray into a solo music career occurred when she featured on will.i.am's "Heartbreaker". After having streetdancing lessons during the filming of Passions of Girls Aloud series, Cheryl was picked to appear in the song's video. She was later asked to sing the female vocals on the UK release of the track, which reached number four in the United Kingdom and sold over 250,000 copies, giving the single a silver certificate by the BPI. It was the 31st best selling single of 2008. Cheryl's solo career began in October 2009 with the release of "Fight for This Love", the lead single from her debut studio album, 3 Words. The track saw Cheryl achieve her first solo number-one single when it topped the UK chart, while also attaining international chart success; peaking within the top 10 in the likes of France, Germany and the Netherlands. The parent album debuted at number one in the UK with sales of 125,271. On 6 November 2009 the British Phonographic Industry (BPI) certified the album platinum. It has since gone 3× Platinum, with sales of over 1,000,000 copies. "3 Words" is both the opening and title song from her debut studio album. It was released in the UK and Ireland on 20 December 2009 went on to become Fernandez-Versini's second consecutive UK top-five and Irish-top ten hit. It was also a top five hit in Australia and has since been certified platinum by the Australian Recording Industry Association and gold by the British Phonographic Industry. "Parachute" was released on 11 March 2010 as the album's third and final single. "Parachute" became Cheryl's third consecutive solo UK top five hit, and her third Irish top 10 hit. It was nominated for a Brit Award in 2011.

October 2010 saw the release of Cheryl's second studio album, Messy Little Raindrops, which became her second consecutive number-one album in the UK; the album was certified Platinum by BPI, with shipments in the UK in the excess of 300,000. The album was preceded by the release of its lead single, "Promise This". "Promise This" debuted at number one on the UK Singles Chart, becoming her second solo UK number one behind "Fight for This Love" (October 2009). It sold 157,210 copies in its debut week, which earned it the highest first-week sales of the year, for a non-charity single at that time. "The Flood" was serviced as the second single from the album.

Cheryl released her third studio album, A Million Lights, in June 2012, where it debuted at number two in the United Kingdom selling 34,934 copies in its first week on sale. "A Million Lights" was certified Gold in the United Kingdom for shipments of 100,000 copies. The lead single, "Call My Name", produced by Calvin Harris, became Cheryl's third number-one single with first week sales of 152,001 copies in the United Kingdom, becoming 2012's fastest selling number one single on the UK Singles Chart until December of the same year. "Under the Sun" was serviced as the second single from A Million Lights.

The lead single from her fourth solo studio album Only Human, titled "Crazy Stupid Love" featuring Tinie Tempah was released on 20 July 2014. The single became her fourth solo UK number one after it entered at the top of the UK Singles Chart, and also topped the charts in the Republic of Ireland and Scotland. The single notched up a combined chart sales figure of 118,000 in its first week in the UK, with audio streams contributing just over 3%. The album's second single, "I Don't Care", had sold over 82,000 copies in the United Kingdom during the week of its release, and debut at the top of the UK Singles Chart. It gave the singer her tenth number-one single, and fifth as a solo artist, overtaking current record sharers Geri Halliwell and Rita Ora setting a new record for most number one singles by a British female artist for Cheryl, with five. Only Human was released on 10 November 2014. It became her fourth solo album to debut within the top 10 in the United Kingdom and the Republic of Ireland.

After giving birth to her son in March 2017, Cheryl took a hiatus from music to focus on motherhood. She made her comeback with the single, "Love Made Me Do It", on 9 November 2018 to intense media scrutiny. It peaked on the UK Singles Chart at number 19, and was supported by a controversial performance on the 15th series of The X Factor UK. On 31 May 2019, she released a follow-up single, "Let You".

== Studio albums ==
List of albums, with selected chart positions, sales figures and certifications
Title	Album details	Peak chart positions										Sales	Certifications
Title	Album details	UK	AUS	AUT	FRA	GER	IRE	NLD	NOR	SCO	SWI	Sales	Certifications
3 Words	Released: 23 October 2009; Label: Fascination, Polydor; Formats: CD, digital download	1	31	26	37	45	2	40	18	2	52	UK: 1,000,000 (Note: Sales of 3 Words in the United Kingdom as of 2013.)	BPI: 3× Platinum; IRMA: 2× Platinum; IFPI: Platinum
Messy Little Raindrops	Released: 29 October 2010; Label: Polydor; Formats: CD, digital download	1	—	—	—	—	2	—	—	2	—		BPI: Platinum; IRMA: Platinum
A Million Lights	Released: 15 June 2012; Label: Polydor; Formats: CD, digital download	2	—	—	—	—	2	—	—	1	—		BPI: Gold
Only Human	Released: 7 November 2014; Label: Polydor; Formats: CD, digital download	7	—	—	—	—	9	—	—	8	—		BPI: Silver
"—" denotes album that did not chart or was not released

== Extended plays ==
List of extended plays, with selected details
Title	Details
3 Words: The B-Sides	Released: 18 April 2010; Label: Fascination; Formats: digital download

== Singles ==
=== As lead artist ===
List of singles, with selected chart positions
Title	Year	Peak chart positions										Certifications	Album
Title	Year	UK	AUS	AUT	BEL (Fl)	FRA	GER	IRE	ITA	SCO	SPA	Certifications	Album
"Fight for This Love"	2009	1	54	4	13	7	4	1	5	1	12	BPI: 2× Platinum; BVMI: Gold; FIMI: Platinum	3 Words
"3 Words" (featuring will.i.am)	2009	4	5	56	—	—	27	7	7	6	—	BPI: Silver; ARIA: 2× Platinum; FIMI: Gold	3 Words
"Parachute"	2010	5	—	—	— (Note: "Parachute" did not enter the Ultratop 50, but peaked at number 14 on the Flemish Ultratip chart.)	—	78	4	—	2	—	BPI: Gold	3 Words
"Promise This"	2010	1	78	—	— (Note: "Promise This" did not enter the Ultratop 50, but peaked at number 19 on the Flemish Ultratip chart.)	—	—	1	—	1	—	BPI: Gold	Messy Little Raindrops
"The Flood"	2011	18	—	—	—	—	—	26	—	14	—		Messy Little Raindrops
"Call My Name"	2012	1	49	—	— (Note: "Call My Name" did not enter the Ultratop 50, but peaked at number 36 on the Flemish Ultratip chart.)	—	—	1	—	1	—	BPI: Platinum	A Million Lights
"Under the Sun"	2012	13	—	—	—	—	—	16	—	12	—	BPI: Silver	A Million Lights
"Crazy Stupid Love" (featuring Tinie Tempah)	2014	1	43	—	— (Note: "Crazy Stupid Love" did not enter the Ultratop 50, but peaked at number 47 on the Flemish Ultratip chart.)	172	—	1	—	1	39	BPI: Platinum	Only Human
"I Don't Care"	2014	1	—	—	— (Note: "I Don't Care" did not enter the Ultratop 50, but peaked at number 82 on the Flemish Ultratip chart.)	—	—	4	—	1	—	BPI: Gold	Only Human
"Only Human"	2015	70	—	—	—	—	—	—	—	40	—		Only Human
"Love Made Me Do It"	2018	19	—	—	—	—	—	32	—	2	—		Non-album singles
"Let You"	2019	57	—	—	—	—	—	73	—	12	—		Non-album singles
"—" denotes album that did not chart or was not released

=== As featured artist ===
Title	Year	Peak chart positions			Certifications	Album
Title	Year	UK	IRE	SCO	Certifications	Album
"Heartbreaker" (will.i.am featuring Cheryl)	2008	4	7	10	BPI: Gold	Songs About Girls
"Everybody Hurts" (as part of Helping Haiti)	2010	1	1	1	BPI: Platinum	Non-album singles
"Check It Out (Special Mix)" (will.i.am & Nicki Minaj featuring Cheryl)	2010	11	14	12		Non-album singles
"—" denotes a single that did not chart or was not released.

== Other charted songs ==
Song	Year	Peak chart positions		Album
Song	Year	UK	SCO	Album
"Boy Like You" (featuring will.i.am)	2009	—	100	3 Words
"Stand Up"	2009	—	89	3 Words
"Screw You" (featuring Wretch 32)	2012	100	95	A Million Lights
"Stars"	2014	—	70	Only Human
"—" denotes song that did not chart or was not released

== Music videos ==
Title	Year	Director(s)	Ref.
"Heartbreaker"	2008	Toben Seymour	
"Fight for This Love"	2009	Ray Kay	
"3 Words" (viral version)	2009	Vincent Haycock	
"3 Words" (split-screen version)	2009	Saam	
"Everybody Hurts"	2010	Joseph Kahn	
"Parachute"	2010	AlexandLiane	
"Check It Out" (UK Special Mix version)	2010	Rich Lee	
"Promise This"	2010	Sophie Muller	
"The Flood"	2010	Sophie Muller	
"Call My Name"	2012	Anthony Mandler	
"Under the Sun"	2012	Anthony Mandler	
"Ghetto Baby"	2012	Rankin	
"Crazy Stupid Love"	2014	Colin Tilley	
"I Don't Care"	2014	Colin Tilley	
"Only Human"	2015	Chris Sweeney	
"Love Made Me Do It"	2018	Sophie Muller	
"Let You"	2019	Unknown	

== See also ==
- List of songs recorded by Cheryl
- Girls Aloud discography
