= Cheryl videography =

Music videos by Cheryl

Cheryl video discography
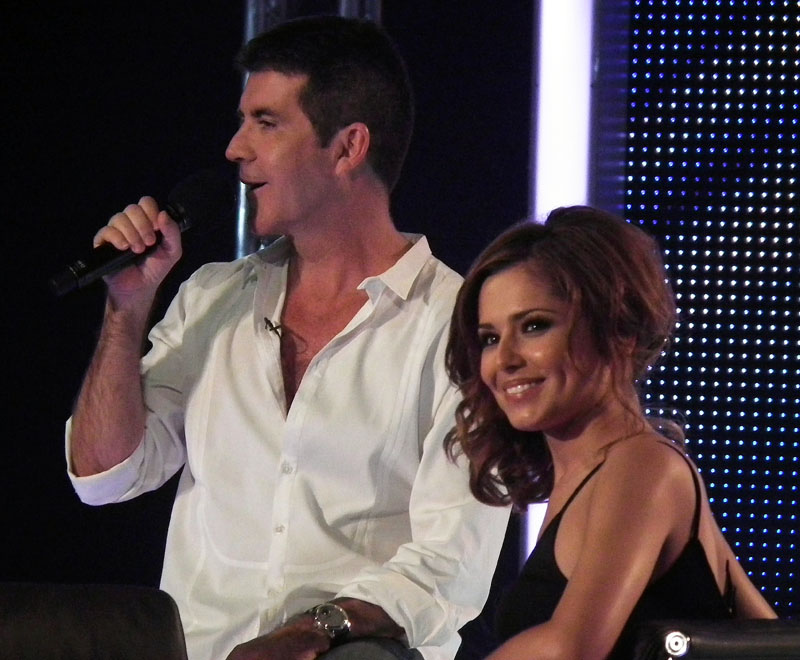
- Cheryl alongside Simon Cowell on The X Factor.
- Music videos: 11
- Other videos: 3
- Television roles: 15
- Films: 2

British recording artist Cheryl has appeared in numerous music videos and films. Her videography includes ten music videos, three guest appearances in other artists' videos, two film appearances and several television appearances.

Cheryl released her debut solo single "Fight for This Love", from her debut album 3 Words, the video was shot in 2009 by director Ray Kay, and the second and third single's videos from the album were shot by Vincent Haycock and AlexandLiane, respectively. In 2010, Cheryl released her second studio album Messy Little Raindrops. The lead single from the album "Promise This" was directed by Sophie Muller, as was the album's second single "The Flood". A Million Lights was the third studio album by Cheryl released in 2012, both singles from the album "Call My Name" and "Under the Sun" were shot by director Anthony Mandler.

Cheryl made her first film appearance in 2007, with her Girls Aloud colleagues in the film St Trinian's. She made her second appearance as a talent show judge in the 2012 film What to Expect When You're Expecting which featured actresses Cameron Diaz and Jennifer Lopez.

Cheryl has been featured in numerous television programs with "Girls Aloud" members including Girls Aloud: Home Truths (2005), Girls Aloud: Off the Record (2006), The Passions of Girls Aloud (2008), The Girls Aloud Party (2008), and the show that formed the band Popstars: The Rivals (2002). In 2009 Cheryl was given a one-off television special entitled Cheryl Cole's Night In, produced for ITV, broadcast on 12 December 2009 at 6:30 pm.

In 2008, Cheryl replaced Sharon Osbourne on The X Factor following Osbourne's departure. In Cheryl's first year on the show, she ended up as the victorious judge when Alexandra Burke was crowned the fifth winner of The X Factor on 13 December 2008. Cheryl returned for the sixth series in 2009 and was given the boys category (made up of male contestants aged 16 to 25). Cheryl emerged as the winning judge for a second consecutive year after Joe McElderry was crowned the sixth winner of The X Factor. She returned for a third year in which her act came second. In 2011, she left the British X Factor and moved to The X Factor USA, before being replaced by Nicole Scherzinger. She returned to the UK X Factor as a main judge in 2014 and 2015.

== Music videos ==
Song	Year	Artist(s)	Director(s)	Description
"Fight for This Love"	2009	Cheryl Cole	Ray Kay	The video starts off with the songstress looking in a simple white vest, make-up done and sporting biker gloves giving her that edge. Accompanied with an entourage of all female dancers dressed in black. Cheryl then breaks out into choreographed dance routines. Various scenes throughout the video include Cheryl rocking silk leopard print bottoms, an all black outfit with silver sparks coming out from both sides of her top, where she is, standing in what would appear to be her maths workbook, in which she has been doodling and writing poems rather than doing her maths. She is wearing what appears to be a corset with two miniature beds of nails strapped to the side and [later] a soldier themed outfit with the famous red Balmain jacket in which she salutes a full eight times during the video.
"3 Words" (viral version)	2009	Cheryl Cole featuring will.i.am	Vincent Haycock	The video begins with Cheryl sitting alongside will.i.am, wearing a "Lady Gaga-inspired platinum blonde wig" and a "lace veil".
"3 Words" (split-screen version)	2009	Cheryl Cole featuring will.i.am	Saam	
"Parachute"	2010	Cheryl Cole	AlexandLiane	The accompanying music video for "Parachute" was filmed in early January 2010 at Eltham Palace in London and made its debut on T4 at 12.20 GMT on 31 January 2010. The video was directed by AlexandLiane and produced by Factory Films.
"Promise This"	2010	Cheryl Cole	Sophie Muller	Cheryl plays a dominant role in part of the video, waiting for a man in a darkened room in one scene and pushing him to the floor with her foot in another. ITN commented on the second part of the film, "We see a softer side to the 27-year-old though, as she dances in a floaty dress, showing off some of her skills which, as a child, won her a sponsorship to study at London's Royal Ballet Summer School." In one of music video's main outfits, Cheryl is seen wearing 'Wolford Bondage Tights'. "In one scene she is dressed in a Madonna-styled black leotard and black jacket with her hair pushed back in a high ponytail. Another scene shows her dressed as a ballerina, and there's another one where she wears a red flamenco dress, all in all she looks spectacular."
"The Flood"	2012	Cheryl Cole	Sophie Muller	Filmed on the southern coast of England, it portrays Cheryl alone in a remote house overlooking a stormy ocean, while she struggles to adjust to life without her love.
"Call My Name"	2012	Cheryl	Anthony Mandler	It starts with a quote from philosopher Marquis de Sade that reads, "The only way to a woman's heart is along the path of torment." This is followed by scenes of Cheryl strutting down a deserted tunnel that is strewn with graffiti before meeting with her dancers and performing an elaborate dance routine in a neon yellow bra, There was also some offseens which featured Cheryl Posing In The London Eye.
"Under the Sun"	2012	Cheryl	Anthony Mandler	The video starts with Cheryl in a crowded café of suited men strolling to a juke box before leaving – attracting the attention of every bloke present. Later, she walks down a decidedly modern street, complete with phone box, bus stop and cash point, before reclining on the bonnet of a classic car while a gang of gents in 50s suits dance around her. Not being able to get enough of hunky dancers, after more strutting down the street in her leopard print heels, Cheryl breaks out a routine in front of a flashing background with the help of two shirtless blokes. As the sun sets, she walks down a dark street – with yet more dancing – before going back into a café and chatting up a group of soldiers, making sure she nabs a slurp of milkshake on the way.
"Ghetto Baby"	2012	Cheryl	Rankin	An accompanying music video was directed by Rankin, and features Cheryl and her then boyfriend and back-up dancer Tre Holloway indulging in a public display of affection while performing the track.
"Crazy Stupid Love"	2014	Cheryl featuring Tinie Tempah	Colin Tilley	The music video for the song was shot in May 2014 at The Underground Club in London and directed by Colin Tilley. It premiered on 9 June 2014. The video sees Cheryl performing the track in The Underground Club, while Tinie Tempah also makes a cameo.
"I Don't Care"	2014	Cheryl	Colin Tilley	The accompanying music video for "I Don't Care" was directed by Colin Tilley in August 2014 in Málaga, Spain. The pair had previously collaborated on previous single "Crazy Stupid Love". The same month, the singer teased her followers on social media with pictures from the video. It starts with a honey-skinned Cheryl skipping around a beach with long locks and smiling, wearing oversized wooly jumper. In another scene, Cheryl is on a luxury boat with a group of friends in a white crop-top, denim shorts and bright pink sunglasses. During the video, she also dances in a yellow crop-top, while shots of her on top of a cliff are also shown. At one point, the singer is in bed wearing nothing but a white shirt and smudged eyeliner, with glimpses of black, lace underwear underneath, and looks directly into the camera and mouthing "zero fucks given".
"Only Human"	2015	Cheryl	Chris Sweeney	The accompanying music video for "Only Human" was directed by Chris Sweeney and co-directed by Cheryl herself. On 2 February 2014, Cheryl shared a sneak peek of the video, along with pictures which saw her with very long hair extensions and a tummy-baring top, along with another one featuring her sitting in the sand wearing a T By Alexander Wang beige silk bralet and a pink tutu. The music video officially premiered on 4 February 2015. It depicts the singer controlling the world opening her fingers to release energy, dust and glistening stars. The video also flicks from day to night through Cheryl's powers, whilst flames begin to light up the night's sky.
"Love Made Me Do It"	2018	Cheryl	Sophie Muller	
"Let You"	2019	Cheryl	Unknown	

=== Featured videos ===
Song	Year	Artist(s)	Director(s)	Description
"Heartbreaker"	2008	will.i.am featuring Cheryl Cole	Toben Seymour	The music video begins with various shots of will.i.am and Cheryl in front of a black background with flashing lights. As the first verse begins, will.i.am sings in front of the black background while controlling and/or holding a glowing red ball a la telekinesis. He is also seen in a convertible with a girl, while they look at moving stars. will.i.am dances using the famous Michael Jackson slide from "Billie Jean" in front of the black, with a spotlight shining on one of various women posing next to him. One of the women is Cheryl, who can be seen with will.i.am or singing her lines in front of moving lights. The light turns off of her when her lines have finished, and shots of different women grinding on will.i.am are shown. He moves star-like lights with his hands, like the red ball from the beginning of the music video. The stars, which are people wearing black bodysuits with lights attached, mimic will.i.am's dancing. A number of clips of will.i.am and Cheryl singing and dancing, both together and separately, are shown throughout the remainder of the video.
"Everybody Hurts" (as part of Helping Haiti)	2010	Various artists	Joseph Kahn	
"Check It Out" (UK Special Mix version)	2010	will.i.am featuring Nicki Minaj and Cheryl Cole	Rich Lee	The music video for the UK special mix was released on 11 November 2010. It is mostly the same as the original, with added clips that include Cheryl.

== Filmography ==
Year	Film	Role	Description
2007	St Trinian's	Girl group member	Cameo role with Girls Aloud
2012	What to Expect When You're Expecting	Herself	Cameo role as TV dance talent show judge
2020	Four Kids and It	Coco Rayne	TV film

== Television ==
Year	Film	Role	Description
2002	Popstars: The Rivals	Contestant (Winner)	Popstars The Rivals (often stylised as Popstars: The Rivals) was a British television talent show series that was broadcast on ITV1 in late 2002. It was the second UK series of the international Popstars franchise. Unlike the Popstars, which resulted in the formation of one winning group – Hear'Say – Popstars: The Rivals created two rival groups, Girls Aloud and One True Voice, who competed against each other for the Christmas Number One spot on the UK Singles Chart.
2005	Girls Aloud: Home Truths	Herself	The programme followed the group for six months, during preparation for their What Will the Neighbours Say? Live tour, the release of their tenth single, "Long Hot Summer", and recording their third studio album, Chemistry. The programme focuses on the recording of "Models" and "On My Way to Satisfaction". The show pulled in nearly 267,000 viewers, which was a 1.6% share of the audience for that night.
2006	Girls Aloud: Off the Record	Herself	Girls Aloud: Off the Record is a six-part series recorded by Girls Aloud for E4 that started on 11 April 2006 at 10:30pm. The show was produced by E4 and Monkey Kingdom Productions for Channel Four Television Corporation.
2006	Ghosthunting With Girls Aloud	Herself	
2007	Comic Relief Does The Apprentice	Contestant (Won)	Comic Relief Does The Apprentice is a special celebrity version of British reality television series The Apprentice, produced to raise money for Comic Relief.
2007	The Friday Night Project	Presenter	The Sunday Night Project is a British comedy-variety show by Princess Productions that first aired on Channel 4 in February 2005 under the title The Friday Night Project. Originally broadcast on Friday nights, the show moved to Sunday nights for its seventh series in 2008.
2008	The Passions of Girls Aloud	Herself	The Passions of Girls Aloud is a four-part television series starring girl group Girls Aloud. The series premiered on ITV2 on 14 March 2008.
2008	The Girls Aloud Party	Presenter and Performer	The Girls Aloud Party was a one-off Christmas variety show starring British girl group Girls Aloud, produced for ITV. The show was aired on 13 December 2008 in between The X Factor series finale and its results show. All five members took part in the Show unlike their previous TV effort. The Show generally consisted of the group performing singles and unheard songs as well as intercepted with sketches and interaction with the audience.
2008–2010, 2014–2015	The X Factor	Judge	Cheryl replaced Sharon Osbourne in series 5 following her departure. Following series 7, Simon Cowell and Cheryl both left to judge the American version of the show. In 2014, she returned to The X Factor for series 11 to replace Osbourne again. She remained in the show for series 12.
2009	Cheryl Cole's Night In	Herself	Cheryl Cole's Night In was a one-off television special, starring Cheryl, produced for ITV and broadcast on 12 December 2009 at 6:30 pm. The programme was hosted by Holly Willoughby, featured a host of other performers and acted as a lead-in to the final of the sixth series of The X Factor, in which Cheryl was a judge. She performed songs from her debut solo album, 3 Words, and the programme also featured performances from other musical acts as well as interviews conducted by Willoughby. The programme received mixed reviews from critics and was watched by 5 million people; this is substantially less than the viewing figures of other programmes airing at the same time.
2010	Piers Morgan's Life Stories	Herself	Cheryl was interviewed during an episode of the fourth series of Piers Morgan's Life Stories, in which she discussed her marriage and divorce with Ashley Cole and her life-threatening battle with malaria. The show, broadcast on 23 October 2010, drew an audience of 7.2 million: the highest figure in the chat show's history.
2011	The X Factor USA	Judge	The original judging panel consisted of Cowell, Cheryl, Paula Abdul, and L.A. Reid, with Nicole Scherzinger and Steve Jones as co-hosts. However, Cheryl was dismissed after just two sets of auditions and was swiftly replaced by Scherzinger, leaving Jones to host the show by himself.
2012	The X Factor	Guest mentor	Cheryl returned to The X Factor as a guest mentor to help judge Gary Barlow pick his finalist for the finals of the competition.
2012	Cheryl – Access All Areas	Herself	Access All Areas was a "fly-on-the wall" access to Cheryl's first ever solo arena tour, the A Million Lights Tour, and also an insight of her personal life. The show attracted 811,000 viewers on ITV2 and 177,000 watched on +1.
2012	Cheryl: Live in Concert—A Million Lights Tour	Herself	An abbreviated concert special, filmed at The O2 Arena in London, was shown on 25 November 2012 on ITV2, with a DVD of the concert released the following day.
2012	Girls Aloud: Ten Years at the Top	Herself	Girls Aloud: Ten Years at the Top is a documentary released to coincide with the tenth anniversary of British all-female pop group Girls Aloud. The documentary follows Girls Aloud from their formation on the ITV reality television programme Popstars: The Rivals to their reunion after a three-year hiatus.
2013	Ten: The Hits Tour	Herself	Girls Aloud live from the O2 Arena and last ever interview as a group.
2013	Text Santa	Herself	Coronation Street sketch broadcast on 20 December 2013.
2014	Britain's Got Talent	Performer	Performed "Crazy Stupid Love" alongside Tinie Tempah during the Series 8 finale on 7 June 2014.
2016	Who Do You Think You Are?	Herself	
2017	The X Factor	Guest mentor	Cheryl returned to The X Factor as a guest mentor to help judge Simon Cowell pick his finalists for the finals of the competition.
2018	The Graham Norton Show	Performer	Performed "Love Made Me Do It".
2018	Michael McIntyre's Big Show	Performer	Performed "Love Made Me Do It".
2019–2020	The Greatest Dancer	Dance Captain	
2019	RuPaul's Drag Race UK	Herself	Guest judge; Series 1; Episode 6: "Thirsty Werk"
2026–	The Voice UK	Herself	Advisor for Team Will, series 14; Coach, series 15

== See also ==
- Girls Aloud videography
- Cheryl discography
