= List of songs recorded by Cheryl =

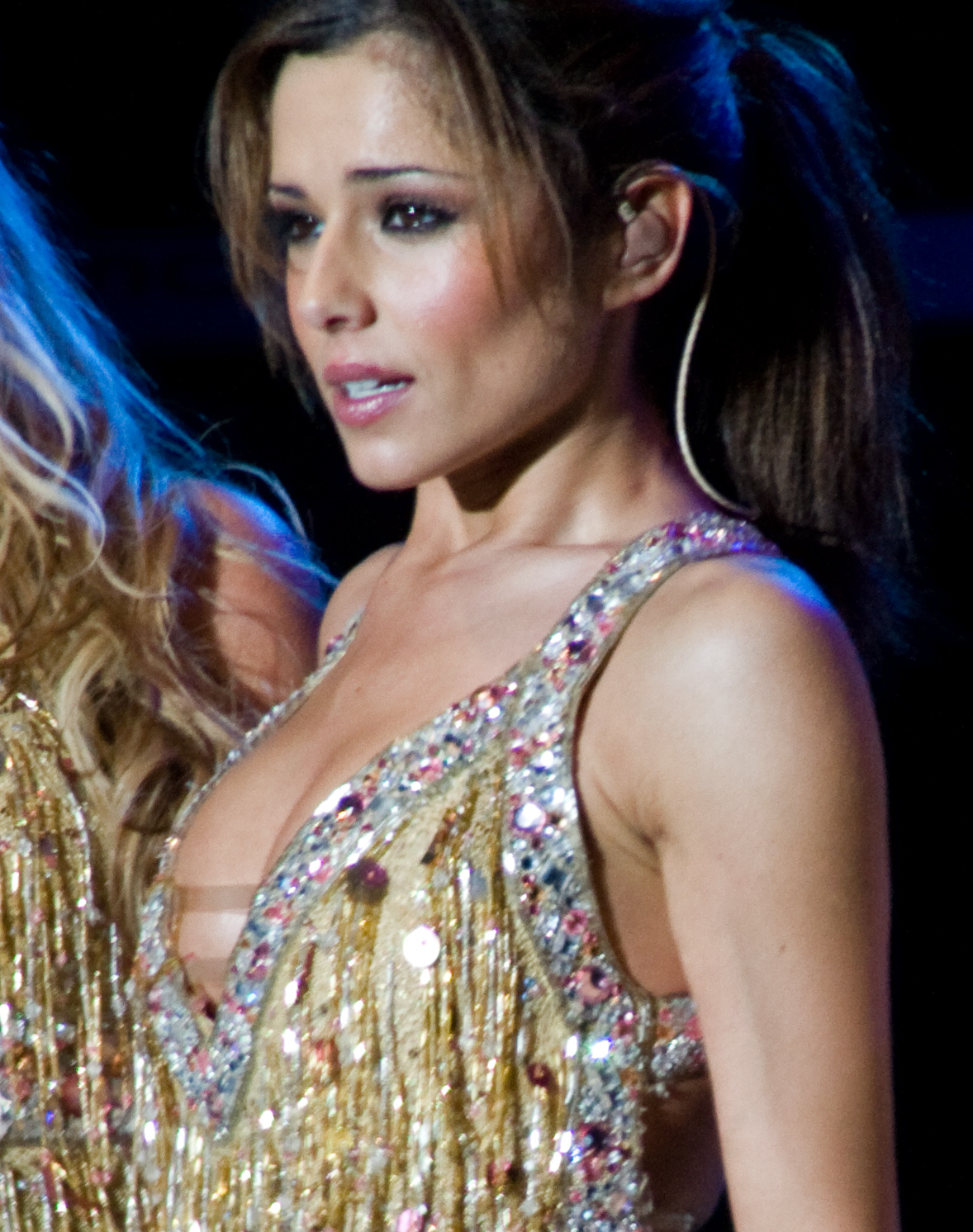
Cheryl during a live performance in 2008

English recording artist Cheryl (formerly a member of English pop group Girls Aloud), has recorded songs for four solo studio albums and one extended play (EP), some of which were collaborations with other recording artists. She first appeared as a solo artist on will.i.am's song "Heartbreaker", released on 5 May 2008, providing backing vocals during the chorus.

Her debut studio album, entitled 3 Words, was released in October 2009. "Fight for This Love" was released as the lead single; it is a hybrid of genres, combining pop, dance and R&B. It was co-written by Andre Merritt, Steve Kipner and Wayne Wilkins. American songwriter Priscilla Renea penned the track "Happy Hour", which compares a relationship to an alcohol addiction. Fraser T Smith and Taio Cruz collaborated on the song "Stand Up". will.i.am co-wrote four tracks with Cheryl, and appears as a featured artist on three of them: the second single release title track, "Heaven" and "Boy Like You". The third and final single to be released from the album was "Parachute", a pop love song written by Ingrid Michaelson and Marshall Altman. On 18 April 2010, Cole released a three track EP entitled 3 Words – The B-Sides EP.

Cheryl released her second album called Messy Little Raindrops in October 2010. The lead single, "Promise This", is an upbeat pop song which is more influenced by dance music compared to her previous material. "The Flood" served as the album's second and final single. The soft rock song was written by Renea and Wilkins. Cole reunited with will.i.am and they wrote two tracks together, "Live Tonight" and "Let's Get Down", and appears as a featured artist on the latter. J.R. Rotem produced the track "Better to Lie", which features August Rigo, while Travie McCoy co-wrote and appears as a guest artist on the song "Yeah Yeah". American singer-songwriter Kelis co-wrote the track "Waiting". Cheryl provided background vocals for will.i.am and Nicki Minaj's track "Check It Out" (Special Mix), and it was released on 29 October 2010.

Cheryl released her third album in June 2012 called A Million Lights. It was preceded by the lead single called "Call My Name", a dance-pop song which was written and produced solely by Calvin Harris. The second single, "Under the Sun", was co-written by Cheryl with Alex da Kid, Carlos Battey, Jayson DeZuzio, Mike Del Rio and Steven Battey. Cheryl and will.i.am collaborated on one song for the album, "Craziest Things", on which he is a guest vocalist. Wretch 32 co-wrote the song "Screw You" and is a featured artist, while Lana Del Rey co-wrote the song "Ghetto Baby". Cruz also contributed to the album, co-writing "Mechanics of the Heart", while Dada Life wrote and produced "Love Killer". Cheryl released her fourth album, Only Human, in November 2014. It was preceded by the singles "Crazy Stupid Love", which featured rapper Tinie Tempah, and "I Don't Care".

== Songs ==
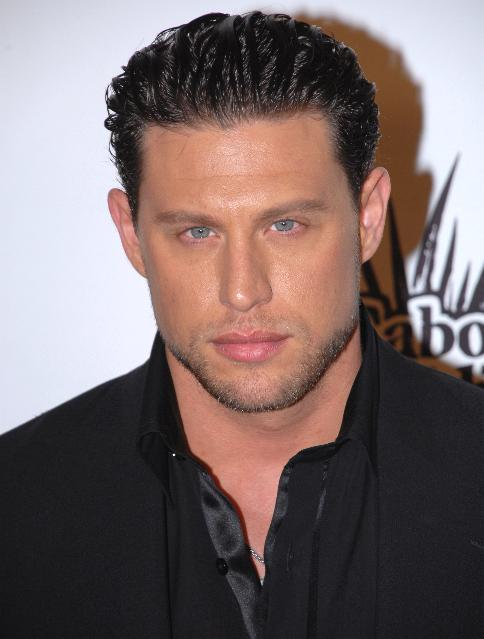
J.R. Rotem co-wrote "Better to Lie".

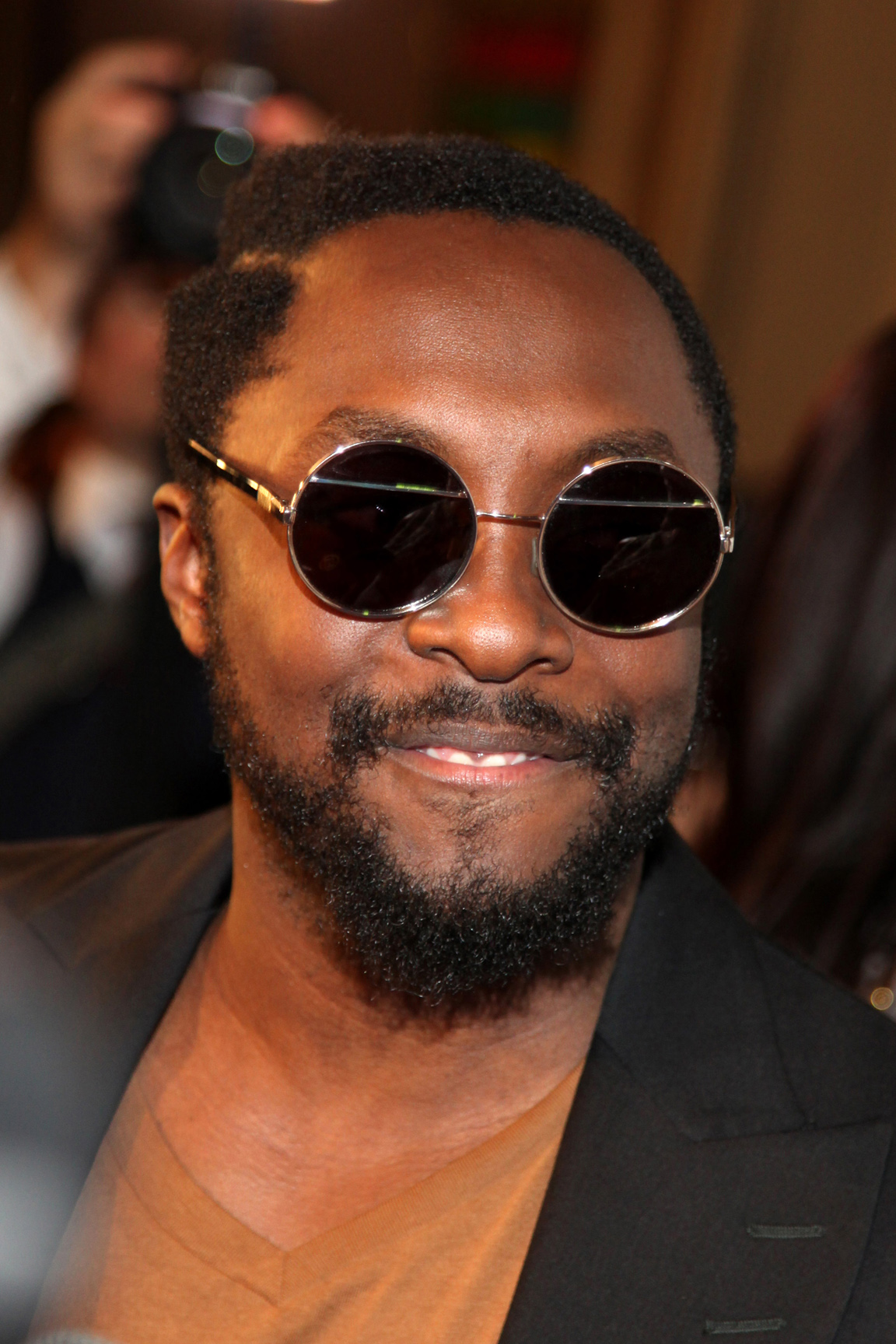
will.i.am has written songs for all three of Cole's albums.

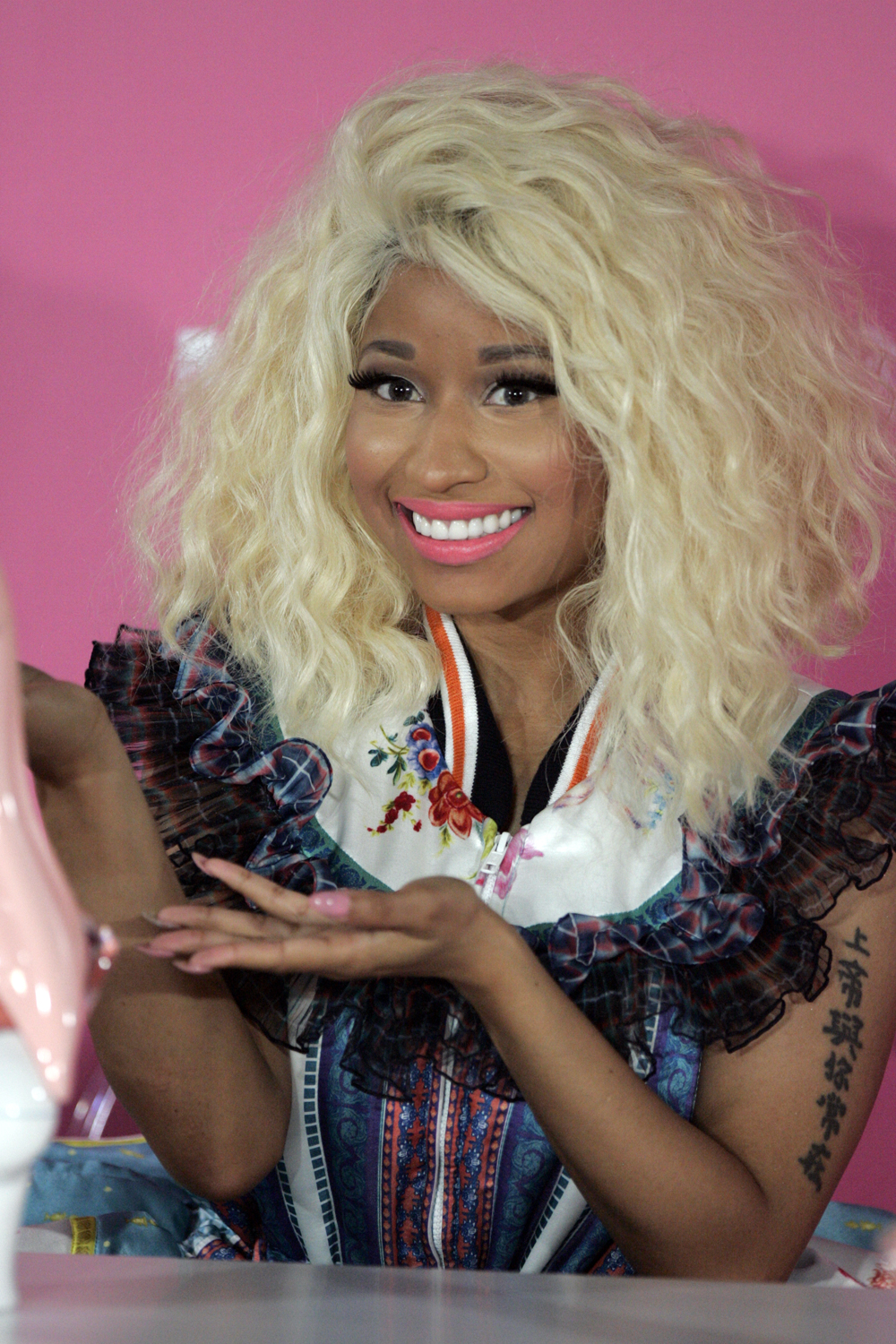
Cole appears on the song "Check It Out (Special Mix)" by will.i.am and Nicki Minaj (pictured).

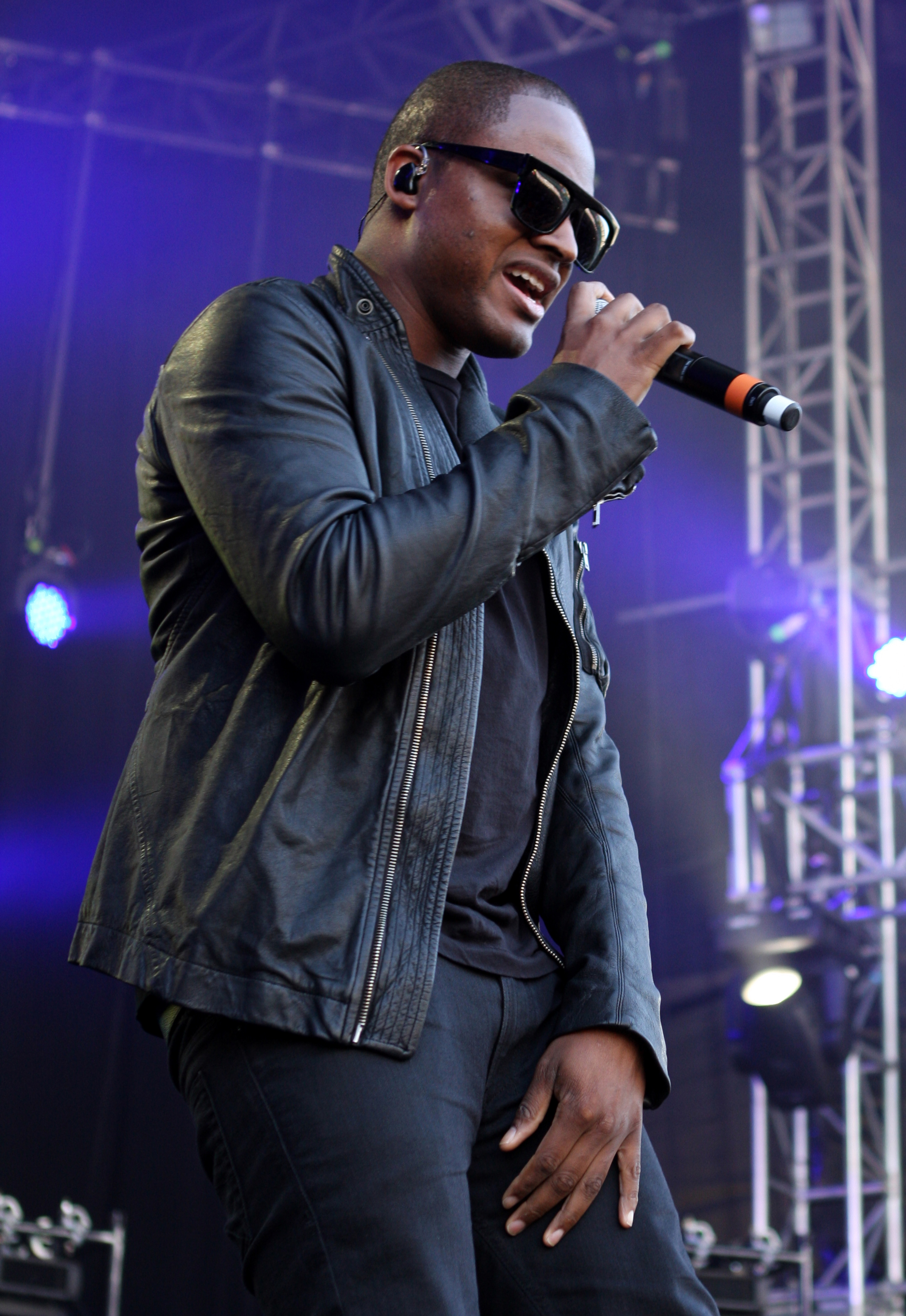
Taio Cruz co-wrote the song "Stand Up".

Key
†	Indicates single release

Song	Artist(s)	Writer(s)	Album	Year	Ref.
"3 Words" †	Cheryl featuring will.i.am	Cheryl; William Adams; George Pajon	3 Words	2009	
"All is Fair"	Cheryl	Candice Nelson; James Washington	A Million Lights	2012	
"Amnesia"	Cheryl	Steve Kipner; Tamyra Savage; Wayne Wilkins	Messy Little Raindrops	2010	
"Better to Lie"	Cheryl featuring August Rigo	August Rigo; J.R. Rotem	Messy Little Raindrops	2010	
"Boy Like You"	Cheryl featuring will.i.am	Cheryl Cole; William Adams	3 Words	2009	
"Boys"	Cheryl	Emeli Sandé; James Murray; Mustafa Omer; Shahid Khan	3 Words – The B-Sides EP	2010	
"Boys Lie"	Cheryl	James Washington; Koil Preample; Roy "Dyshon" Warren	A Million Lights	2012	
"Call My Name" †	Cheryl	Calvin Harris	A Million Lights	2012	
"Check It Out" (Special Mix) †	will.i.am and Nicki Minaj featuring Cheryl	Bruce Woolley; Geoff Downes; Onika Maraj; Trevor Horn; William Adams	Single release only	2010	
"Craziest Things"	Cheryl featuring will.i.am	Andrea Martin; Cheryl Cole; Shahid Khan; William Adams	A Million Lights	2012	
"Crazy Stupid Love" †	Cheryl featuring Tinie Tempah	Wayne Wilkins; Cheryl Cole; Tinie Tempah	Only Human	2014	
"Didn't I"	Cheryl	Andrea Remanda; Cheryl Cole; Klaus Dorendauf	3 Words – The B-Sides EP	2010	
"Don't Talk About This Love"	Cheryl	Chris Braide; Nikola Rachelle	3 Words	2009	
"Dum Dum"	Cheryl	Billy Wes; Onique Williams	A Million Lights	2012	
"Everybody Hurts" †	Helping Haiti	Bill Berry; Michael Stipe; Mike Mills; Peter Buck	Single release only	2010	
"Everyone"	Cheryl featuring Dizzee Rascal	Andre Merritt; Antwoine Collins; Dylan Mills; Wayne Wilkins	Messy Little Raindrops	2010	
"Fight for This Love" †	Cheryl	Andre Merritt; Steve Kipner; Wayne Wilkins	3 Words	2009	
"Girl in the Mirror"	Cheryl	Aaron Cowan; Jareth Rwamafa-Johnson	A Million Lights	2012	
"Ghetto Baby"	Cheryl	Anu Pillai; Elizabeth Grant; Roy Kerr	A Million Lights	2012	
"Happy Hour"	Cheryl	Carsten Schack; Kenneth Karlin; Priscilla Renea	3 Words	2009	
"Happy Tears"	Cheryl	Antwoine Collins; Nasri Atweh; Wayne Wilkins	Messy Little Raindrops	2010	
"Heartbreaker" †	will.i.am featuring Cheryl	William Adams	3 Words and Songs About Girls	2008	
"Heaven"	Cheryl featuring will.i.am	Cheryl Cole; William Adams	3 Words	2009	
"Hummingbird"	Cheryl	Al Shuckburgh; Priscilla Renea	Messy Little Raindrops	2010	
"I Like It"	Cheryl	Candice Nelson; Cheryl Cole; James Washington	A Million Lights	2012	
"Just Let Me Go"	Cheryl	Claude Kelly; Reggie Perry	3 Words – The B-Sides EP	2010	
"Last One Standing"	Cheryl	Billy Wes; Onique Williams	A Million Lights	2012	
"Let's Get Down"	Cheryl featuring will.i.am	Cheryl Cole; William Adams	Messy Little Raindrops	2010	
"Let You"	Cheryl	Cheryl Cole Chiara Hunter Danny Casio George Astasio Jason Pebworth Jon Shave Nicola Roberts	TBA	2019	
"Live Tonight"	Cheryl	Cheryl Cole; William Adams	Messy Little Raindrops	2010	
"Love Killer"	Cheryl	Kasia Livingston; Stefan Engblom; Olle Corneer	A Million Lights	2012	
"Love Made Me Do It" †	Cheryl	Cheryl; Nicola Roberts; Kylie Minogue; Natasha Bedingfield; Miranda Cooper	TBA	2018	
"Make Me Cry"	Cheryl	Caleb Speir; Cheryl Cole; William Adams	3 Words	2009	
"Make You Go"	Cheryl	Cameron Roberson; David Loeffler; Jaylien Wesley	A Million Lights	2012	
"Mechanics of the Heart"	Cheryl	Loick Essien; Mathias Wollo; Taio Cruz	A Million Lights	2012	
"A Million Lights"	Cheryl	Greg Bonnick; Leon Price; Peter Renshaw; Tom Havelock	A Million Lights	2012	
"One Thousand"	Cheryl	E.F. Erfjord; H.B. Michelsen; L. Marshall; Robert Rosiji-Griffith	A Million Lights	2012	
"Parachute" †	Cheryl	Ingrid Michaelson; Marshall Altman	3 Words	2009	
"Promise This" †	Cheryl	Christopher Jackson; Priscilla Renea; Wayne Wilkins	Messy Little Raindrops	2010	
"Raindrops"	Cheryl	Alain Whyte; Jean Baptiste; Michael McHenry; Nick Marsh; Priscilla Renea; Ryan Buendia	Messy Little Raindrops	2010	
"Rain on Me"	Cheryl	Louis Biancaniello; Steve Kipner; Olivia Waithe; Sam Watters; Wayne Wilkins	3 Words	2009	
"Screw You"	Cheryl featuring Wretch 32	Daniel Traynor; Jermaine Scott; Kingsley Brown; Megan Nicolle Thomaston	A Million Lights	2012	
"Sexy Den a Mutha"	Cheryl	James Washington; Megan Nicolle Thomaston	A Million Lights	2012	
"Stand Up"	Cheryl	Fraser T Smith; Taio Cruz	3 Words	2009	
"Teddy Bear"	Cheryl	Cheryl Cole; James Washington	A Million Lights	2012	
"Telescope"	Cheryl	Cara Salimando; Dave Munday	A Million Lights	2012	
"The Flood" †	Cheryl	Priscilla Renea; Wayne Wilkins	Messy Little Raindrops	2010	
"Under the Sun †	Cheryl	Alexander Grant; Carlos Battey; Cheryl Cole; Jayson DeZuzio; Mike Del Rio; Steven Battey	A Million Lights	2012	
"Waiting"	Cheryl	Jean Baptiste; Kelis Rogers; Michael McHenry; Nick Marsh; Ryan Buendia	Messy Little Raindrops	2010	
"Yeah Yeah"	Cheryl featuring Travie McCoy	Fin Dow-Smith; Travie McCoy; Wayne Hector	Messy Little Raindrops	2010	
