= Only Human (Cheryl album) =

Studio album by Cheryl
- Released: 7 November 2014
- Recorded: July 2013 – August 2014
- Genres: Pop; electronic; R&B
- Length: 51:30
- Label: Polydor
- Producers: Jocke Åhlund; Dawood; Electric; Scott Hoffman; The Invisible Men; Greg Kurstin; Cass Lowe; Red Triangle; Matt Schwartz; Lucas Secon; Jesse Shatkin; Wayne Wilkins

Cheryl chronology
A Million Lights (2012)	Only Human (2014)

Singles from Only Human
- 1. "Crazy Stupid Love" Released: 30 June 2014; 2. "I Don't Care" Released: 2 November 2014; 3. "Only Human" Released: 22 March 2015

Only Human is the fourth studio album by English singer Cheryl. It was released on 7 November 2014, through Polydor Records. Following a slew of media invasion, Cheryl took a one-year hiatus from music. Following her hiatus, Cheryl confirmed that Girls Aloud would reunite and release a greatest hits compilation. After its release, the group embarked on their last tour and announced their permanent split. In July 2013 Cheryl began recording Only Human; the recording was later completed in August 2014.

Only Human explores themes of being at peace with oneself, banishing bad influences and living life to the full. Musically, the album follows in the same vein as Cheryl's previous work, taking influence from pop and R&B, however the album contains a diverse musical style ranging from the 1980s, disco-pop to electro. The album's production is characterised as being sparsely produced. Cheryl worked with a variety of writers and producers including frequent collaborators and new ones to create her desired sound, she also contributed a large amount of writing herself.

The album was preceded by lead single "Crazy Stupid Love", which featured British rapper Tinie Tempah, released on 18 July 2014. The song debuted at number one on the UK Singles Chart, selling 118,000 copies in its first week, becoming Cole's fourth number one single. The album's second single, "I Don't Care", was released before the album on 31 October 2014 and became Cheryl's fifth number one, making her the first ever British female solo artist to have five number ones in the UK. The album was released on 16 February 2015 in the USA. Only Human entered the UK albums chart at number seven, number 8 on the Scottish albums chart and number 9 on the Irish albums chart becoming here forth consecutive top ten album in all three charts. The albums has since been certified silver by the UK for shipping a total of 60,000 units.

== Background ==
Cheryl released her third studio album, A Million Lights, on 18 June 2012. The album was supported with the release of the lead single, "Call My Name" (2012), which became Cheryl's third number one single on the UK Singles Chart, with the sales of 152,001 digital copies. The song also became 2012's fastest selling number one single on the UK Singles Chart until December of the same year. During this time, Cheryl also embarked on her first solo concert tour, A Million Lights Tour, which started on 3 October 2012 and concluded on 17 October 2012.

Following months of speculation, Cheryl confirmed that Girls Aloud's reunion would occur in November 2012. To celebrate their tenth anniversary, Girls Aloud reunited for the release of their second greatest hits compilation, Ten (2012). In March 2013, following the completion of the Ten: The Hits Tour, the group released a statement, confirming their permanent split. The track listing for Only Human was confirmed on 6 October 2014.

== Recording ==
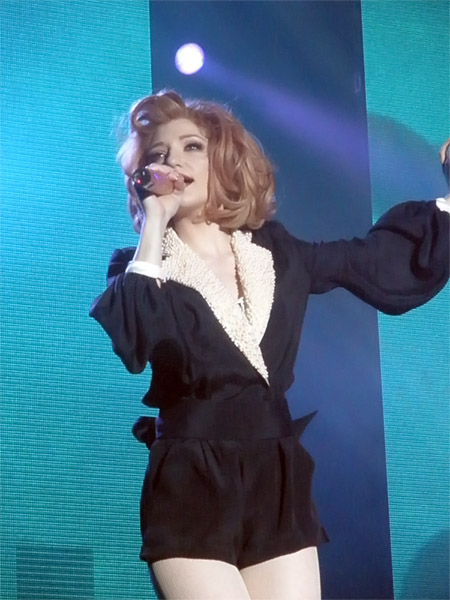
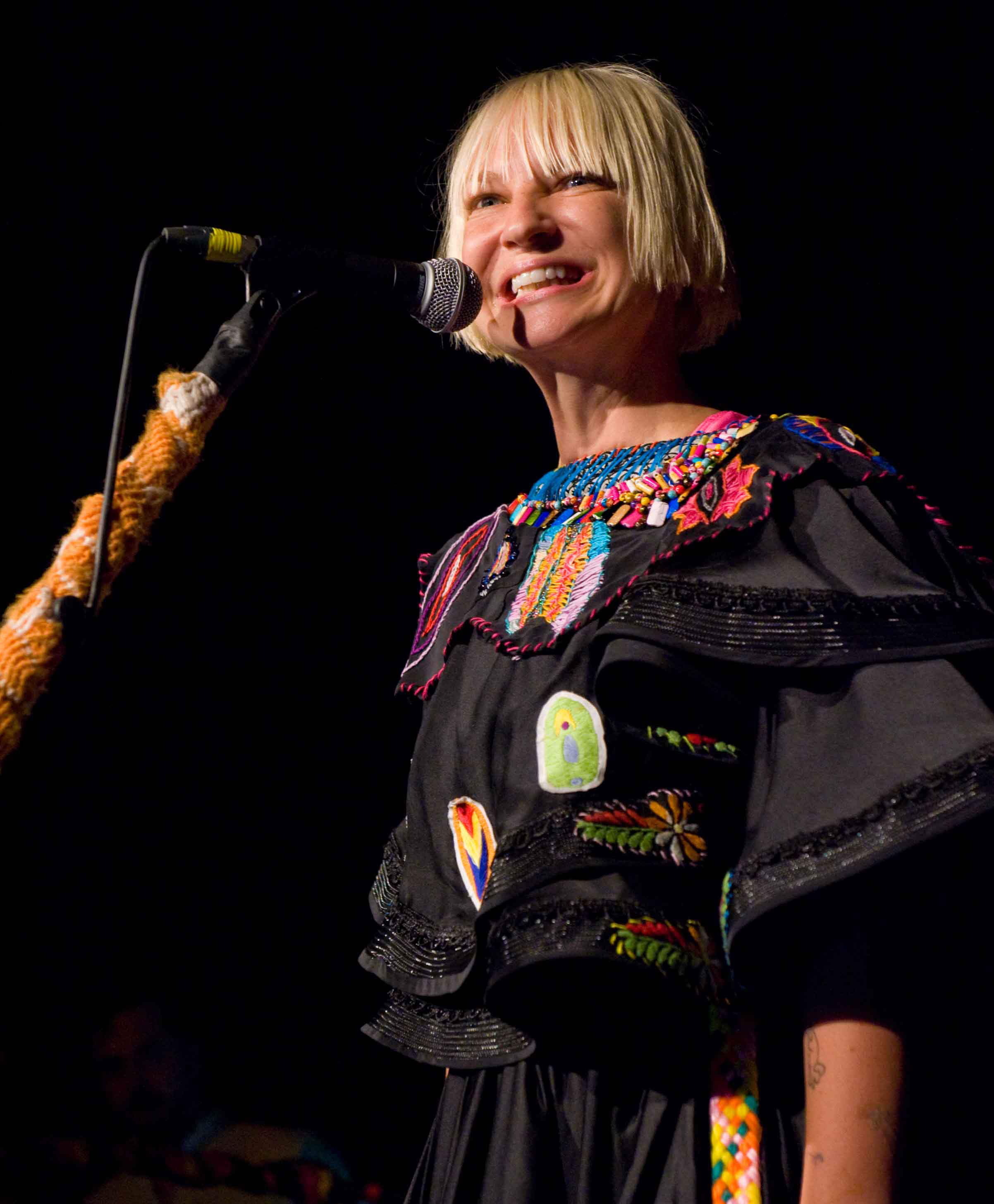
Former Girls Aloud bandmate Nicola Roberts and singer-songwriter Sia were two of the writers that Cheryl worked with during the recording of Only Human.

In July 2013, Cheryl uploaded a picture of a music studio to her official Instagram with the caption: "Back with my first true love", hinting that new material could potentially be on its way. In September 2013, it was reported in that Cheryl would collaborate with former Girls Aloud member Nicola Roberts. Cheryl revealed she had recorded a hip-hop song, co-written by Jon Bellion, who had recently worked with Eminem and Rihanna; producer Jesse Shatkin confirmed the collaboration during an interview with MuuMuse, and also revealed that Cheryl had worked on a new ballad, saying, "It's strong, it's powerful and really from the heart." In June 2014, Cheryl revealed that Australian singer-songwriter Sia had written a couple of songs for Only Human. Cheryl commented, "The song, when I first heard it, was just full of personality. The girl is a genius. I'm just glad I got the chance to work with her."

During the recording of the album Cheryl contributed to the album's writing, including: "Bombs", "One Love", "We Could All Be Stars", "Throwback" and "Coming Up for Air" Only Human's lead single was originally recorded by Kylie Minogue for her twelfth studio album Kiss Me Once (2014). She worked with Wilkins on the track and wanted it to be used on the album, but Minogue's management Roc Nation did not like it because it was "too pop". Wilkins later gave the track to Cheryl to record. Cheryl also worked with producers, such as Greg Kurstin and Invisible Men on songs for the album, as well as new producers, including Red Triangle, Lucas Secon and Electric.

== Composition ==
The album's lyrics explore themes of being at peace with oneself, banishing bad influences and living life to the full. Musically, the album is a mid-tempo pop and R&B album with "electro leanings" that explores a variety of genres ranging from 80s style disco-pop to sparsely produced contemporary songs. Only Human opens was an introduction of a speech from the philosopher Alan Watts, the speech sees Watts discussing a profound dialogue that money doesn't equal happiness. "Live Life Now" is an electronic dance song. Like the introduction, "Live Life Now" continues to sample Watts speech, while Cheryl sings lyrics about money and desires. "It's About Time" lyrical revolves around Cheryl throwing "barbs" and a former lover. "Crazy Stupid Love" is a pop and "dancey" urban pop song built on a toe-tapping structure with plenty of saxophones and a "la la la la la" refrain. Lyrically, the song has Cheryl gushing about her uncontrollable feelings for her boyfriend.

"I Don't Care" is a pop and dance song which lyrically finds Cole singing "It feels so fucking good to say, I swear that I don't care". Idolator website editor Bianca Gracie noted that the song carries "an 80s carefree vibe to it, thanks to the breezy synths and pumping bass line", and in contrast to her other songs like "Ghetto Baby", there are no "massive bass drops or an in-your-face dance theme". "Only Human" is an electro-ballad, with vocals layered in the style of Imogen Heap according to Bradley Stern of Idolator, the song contains encouraging lyrics built over a glittering production. "Stars" is a song Cheryl wrote for her fans, the song's lyrics are "inspiring" described by Stern of Idolator as "bright and self-empowering", "Stars" is an electronic song backed by shimmering and stomping production.

According to Bradley Stern of MuuMuse, "All in One Night" is a song described as is "a slow-burning R&B song" that is compared to Cheryl's song "Ghetto Baby" from her third studio album, A Million Lights (2012). "Coming Up For Air" featuring Joel Compass, is described as the album's most "adventurous" song and "carries just the vaguest hint of the creeping, skeletal production of BANKS and FKA Twigs." "Fight On" is backed by a choir and pounding percussion, with ethereal, tribal beats and lyrically sees Cheryl telling the story of a girl seeking sanctuary.

== Release and promotion ==
During an appearance on The Graham Norton Show, Cheryl confirmed the album's title to be Only Human, stating: "I was exhausted, I'd had a solo tour and then toured with Girls Aloud so I took a year off to be with my family. It was the first time off I'd had in 10 years – it was a normal time. I did party a lot. I needed to let loose and it was the best thing I could do. The title sums up that time." On 3 October 2014, the official album artwork for Only Human was unveiled in both a standard and deluxe edition. While both covers featured the same headshot of Cheryl, the editions differed in their design aspects; the standard cover shows the singer with leopard print makeup around her left eye, while the deluxe shows a stripe across her left eye that is torn away, to reveal a face of a leopard.

Cheryl and Tempah performed "Crazy Stupid Love" for the first time on the final of the eighth series of Britain's Got Talent on 7 June 2014. Cole appeared on The Graham Norton Show on 20 June, and also performed the song as part of her set at Capital FM's Summertime Ball the following day, 21 June 2014. As part of the iTunes pre-order, Cheryl allowed a download of the title track, "Only Human", for those who pre-ordered the album. Bradley Stern of Idolator called the track an "impressive ballad" and also called the track "one of her best offerings from her back catalog". Cheryl also performed on the live results show during the eleventh series of The X Factor. On 4 November 2014, the track "Stars" was put on iTunes as part of a pre-order of the album. Stern of Idolator called the song a "bright and self-empowering number".

=== Singles ===
In June 2014, Cheryl announced the album's lead single, "Crazy Stupid Love", for release on 18 July 2014. The single features rapper Tinie Tempah. The single debuted at number one on the UK Singles Chart, securing the singer her fourth consecutive number one lead single from an album. On 30 September 2014, Cheryl announced that "I Don't Care" would receive its radio debut on the following day, 1 October on Capital FM Radio. The song was co-written by Bonnie McKee, Jocke Ahlund, John Newman and Cheryl, was released on the iTunes Store on 31 October 2014. Idolator.com editor Bianca Gracie described the song as, "a breezy, upbeat pop song built over a 80s production, breezy synths and a pumping bass". The song debuted at the top of the UK charts, setting a new record for most number-one singles by a British female solo artist for Cheryl, with five. On 1 February 2015, Cheryl announced on Twitter that the third single to be lifted from the album would be the title track, "Only Human". The official music video made its premiere on Vevo on 4 February, with an official digital release, featuring a new radio edit of the track by Wilkinson, released on 22 March 2015. The song, which originally peaked at number 70 as an album cut in October 2014, failed to reach the top 100 on the UK Singles Chart upon the single's release, therefore becoming the lowest-charting single of her career, surpassing 2011's "The Flood".

== Critical reception ==
Professional ratings
Review scores
Source	Rating
Digital Spy	3/5 stars
Entertainmentwise	4/5 stars
Gloucestershire Echo	7/10 stars
The Guardian	3/5 stars
Hot Press	2.5/5 stars
Irish Independent	3/5 stars
The Times	3/5 stars
Virgin Media	3/5 stars

Upon its release, Only Human received mixed to positive reviews. Digital Spy editor Lewis Corner gave Only Human a predominately positive review, calling the album "one of her most focused and cohesive records to date". Corner criticised, however, that some songs should not have made it onto the album ("Beats N Bass") and that they "never really peaks the way it should"("Coming Up for Air"); he called one track "thin and limp" ("Throwback"). The website Entertainmentwise praised the singer's latest release, calling it "most cohesive collection' to date"; they praised such songs as "I Don't Care", "Waiting For Lightning" and the title track, explaining that the latter had "affecting vulnerability that nicely counterbalances the brash confidence found elsewhere". Brendon Veevers of Renownedforsound.com described the album as a "strong collection", citing that the album had "promise". Ed Potton of The Times gives a largely positive review, citing Alan Watts and "the importance of doing what you love" as the driving force behind songs like "Live Life Now". Potton goes on to say "she's good at it too", especially on "Stars", which he calls "a soaring anthem to be".

== Commercial performance ==
Only Human debuted at number seven in the United Kingdom, becoming her lowest charting album to date, with a reported 20,000 units sold in the first week of release. However, it went on to sell over 60,000 units The album also debuted at number nine in Ireland, also becoming her lowest charting album to date in that territory. As of November 2018, sales in the UK for Only Human stood at 67,559 units.

== Track listing ==
Only Human standard edition
No.	Title	Writer(s)	Producer(s)	Length
1.	"Intro"	Rick Parkhouse; George Tizzard	Red Triangle	1:51
2.	"Live Life Now"	Cheryl; Max Marshall; Henrik Barman Michelsen; Edvard Førre Erfjord; Tom Havelock	Electric	2:54
3.	"It's About Time"	Nicola Roberts; James Draper; The Invisible Men	The Invisible Men; Draper	3:49
4.	"Crazy Stupid Love" (featuring Tinie Tempah)	Cheryl; Wayne Wilkins; Heidi Rojas; Katelyn Tarver; Patrick Okogwu	Wilkins; Kevin Anyaeji^{[a]}	3:45
5.	"Waiting for Lightning"	Fransisca Hall; Matt Morris; Jesse Shatkin	Shatkin	3:56
6.	"I Don't Care"	Cheryl; Jocke Åhlund; Bonnie McKee; John Stuart Newman	Åhlund; Oligee^{[b]}	4:00
7.	"Only Human"	Matt Schwartz; Jo Perry; Cass Lowe	Schwartz	3:34
8.	"Stars"	Cheryl; G. Tizzard; Parkhouse; Nicole Jones; Daniel Spencer	Red Triangle	2:57
9.	"Throwback"	Cheryl; G. Tizzard; Parkhouse; Camille Purcell; Roberts	Red Triangle	3:04
10.	"All in One Night"	Cheryl; Michelsen; Efjord; Havelock	Electric	3:09
11.	"Goodbye Means Hello"	Lucas Secon; Roberts; Clifford Smith; Haldane Browne; Fridolin Nordsoe; Frederick Nordsoe; Jon Schumann; Bo Rande; Christian Leth	Secon	3:46
12.	"Coming Up for Air" (featuring Joel Compass)	Cheryl; Lowe; Scott Hoffman	Lowe; Babydaddy	4:21
13.	"Fight On"	G. Tizzard; Parkhouse; Katy Tizzard	Red Triangle	3:33
14.	"Yellow Love"	David Dawood; Roberts	DaWood	3:51
15.	"Beats N Bass"	Cheryl; G. Tizzard; Parkhouse; K. Tizzard	Red Triangle	2:59
Total length:				51:30

Deluxe edition bonus tracks
No.	Title	Writer(s)	Producer(s)	Length
16.	"Tattoo"	G. Tizzard; Parkhouse; Andrew Bullimore	Red Triangle	3:07
17.	"Firecracker"	Sia Furler; Greg Kurstin	Kurstin	3:32
18.	"I Won't Break"	Mark Taylor; Alex Smith; Liam Payne; Sam Preston	Red Triangle	3:37
Total length:				61:46

iTunes Store deluxe edition bonus content
No.	Title	Length
19.	"Only Human (Interview)"	2:41
Total length:		64:27

Notes

- ^{^[a]} signifies an additional producer
- ^{^[b]} signifies a co-producer
- "Goodbye Means Hello" contains interpolations of "Heads High" by Mr. Vegas and "School Yard" by The William Blakes.
- The deluxe edition of Only Human has since been removed on the iTunes Store in all regions, except Japan.

== Charts and certifications ==
=== Charts ===
Chart performance for Only Human
Chart (2014)	Peak position
Belgian Albums (Ultratop Flanders)	198
Irish Albums (IRMA)	9
Scottish Albums (Official Charts)	8
UK Albums (Official Charts)	7
UK Album Downloads (Official Charts)	4

=== Certifications ===
Region	Certification	Certified units/sales
United Kingdom (BPI)	Silver	60,000^{‡}
^{‡} Sales+streaming figures based on certification alone.

== Release history ==
Release dates and formats for Only Human
Region	Date	Formats	Label	Editions	Ref
Ireland	7 November 2014	CD; digital download	Polydor	Standard; deluxe	
Australia	7 November 2014	Digital download	Polydor	Standard; deluxe	
United Kingdom	10 November 2014	CD; digital download	Polydor	Standard; deluxe	
Germany	14 November 2014	CD; digital download	Universal Music	Standard; deluxe	
Australia	14 November 2014	CD	Polydor	Standard; deluxe	
New Zealand	14 November 2014	CD; digital download	Polydor	Standard; deluxe	
Spain	18 November 2014	CD; digital download	Polydor	Standard; deluxe	
United States	28 January 2021	Digital download	Polydor	Standard	
