= Only Human (Cheryl song) =

Single by Cheryl

from the album Only Human
- Released: 22 March 2015
- Genre: Electronic
- Length: 3:34
- Label: Polydor
- Songwriters: Matt Schwartz; Jo Perry; Cass Lowe
- Producer: Schwartz

Cheryl singles chronology
"I Don't Care" (2014)	"Only Human" (2015)	"Love Made Me Do It" (2018)

"Only Human" is a song by English recording artist Cheryl from her fourth studio album of the same name (2014). It was released on 22 March 2015 through Polydor Records as the third single from the album. "Only Human" is an electronic ballad, written by Matt Schwartz, Jo Perry and Cass Lowe, whilst produced by Schwartz. Lyrically, it finds Cheryl singing about the inspiration to forgive yourself for being human and live your best life in spite of everything. "Only Human" received positive reviews from music critics, who complimented its production and called it her best ballad to date.

"Only Human" was remixed for radio by British drum and bass producer Wilkinson and was a commercial failure, only peaking at number 70 on the UK Singles Chart as an album cut; after its official release as a single, it failed to reach the top 100, becoming the lowest-charting single of her career. The accompanying music video for "Only Human" was directed by Chris Sweeney and co-directed by Cheryl herself. It depicts the singer controlling the world opening her fingers to release energy, dust and glistening stars, and received positive reviews from critics. Cheryl performed the song on BBC's fundraising show Children in Need 2014 on 14 November 2014.

== Background ==
Following the release of Cole's third studio album, A Million Lights, in June 2012 and embarking on her debut solo headlining tour, Cole confirmed that a Girls Aloud's reunion would occur in November 2012. The group released their second greatest hits compilation, Ten on 26 November 2012 and in 2013, the group embarked on Ten: The Hits Tour. In March 2013, following the completion of the tour, Girls Aloud released a statement via their official Twitter to confirm that they were splitting permanently.

On 27 July 2014, "Crazy Stupid Love", a song featuring rapper Tinie Tempah which served as the lead single from her fourth studio album Only Human, became Cheryl's fourth number one single on the UK Singles Chart, tying her with Geri Halliwell and Rita Ora as the third British female to achieve four solo number ones. Months later, second single "I Don't Care" also debuted at number one. In doing so, Cheryl achieved her ninth number-one single (including those from Girls Aloud), and fifth as a solo artist, therefore becoming the British female artist with the most solo UK number ones, overtaking previous record sharers Halliwell, Ora and Cheryl herself. "Only Human" was premiered on 7 October 2014. In early February 2015, the singer revealed that "Only Human" would be released as the third single from the album on 22 March 2015.

== Composition ==
"Only Human" is an electronic ballad, written by Matt Schwartz, Jo Perry and Cass Lowe, whilst produced by Schwartz. It is layered with Imogen Heap-like vocoders, giving the song a rather alien feel, the opposite of human. According to MuuMuse, "things stay very Immi 'Hide and Seek' in the verses", until the song suddenly explodes into its chorus. Pip Elwood from Entertainment Focus noted that whilst singing the lyrics, Cheryl "reminds you that like everyone else she’s just a person behind the make-up, the fame and the money and that’s something that is often forgotten when it comes to celebrities". For Lewis Corner from Digital Spy, the song has a "cosmic" production.

== Critical reception ==
"Only Human" received generally positive reviews from music critics. MuuMuse was positive, commenting that the song was "actually massive" and the first song from the era that did not sound like it might still be a demo. Bradley Stern while writing for Idolator commented that the "encouraging" song marked a mature new direction for Cheryl, and though it was her "most gorgeous and assured ballad" to date. Entertainmentwise's Shaun Kitchener was also positive, commenting that the "delicate title track provides an affecting vulnerability that nicely counterbalances the brash confidence found elsewhere". Brendon Veevers noted that the album's title track showcased the singer's "pristine" vocals and her ability to switch from dance songs to a torch song with ease and confidence. Pip Elwood from Entertainment Focus was positive, noting that the track is one of the album's most emotive moments and one of the singer's most honest and passionate vocals on Only Human.

== Chart performance ==
On 18 October 2014, "Only Human" debuted and peaked at number 70 on the UK Singles Chart after it became available for those who pre-ordered the Only Human album, lasting for only one week. Upon the single's release on 22 March 2015, it was at number 56 on the mid-week chart, but did not make the week's official top 100 and became the lowest-charting single of her career, surpassing 2011's "The Flood". When the song was released, the singer's husband, Jean-Bernard Fernandez-Versini, took to Instagram to express his frustration at the song not being played enough by radio stations. In Scotland, "Only Human" also did not chart well, peaking at number 40 on its only week in the official charts.

== Music video ==
The accompanying music video for "Only Human" was directed by Chris Sweeney and co-directed by Cheryl herself. On 2 February 2015, Cheryl shared a sneak peek of the video, along with pictures which saw her with very long hair extensions and a tummy-baring top, along with another one featuring her sitting in the sand wearing a T By Alexander Wang beige silk bralet and a pink tutu. The music video officially premiered on 4 February 2015. It depicts the singer controlling the world opening her fingers to release energy, dust and glistening stars. The video also flicks from day to night through Cheryl's powers, whilst flames begin to light up the night's sky.

== Live performance ==
Cheryl performed "Only Human" on BBC's fundraising show Children in Need 2014 on 14 November 2014. At the end of the performance, it received a "thunderous" applause from the studio audience. The performance received positive reviews from critics, with Claire Rutter from Daily Mirror calling the performance "haunting".

== Track listing ==
- Digital download
1. "Only Human (Radio Mix)" – 3:25
- Digital download – The Remixes
1. "Only Human" (Club Mix) – 5:19
2. "Only Human" (Super Stylers Remix) – 6:20
3. "Only Human" (iLL BLU Remix) – 5:34

== Credits and personnel ==
Credits are adapted from the Only Human liner notes.

Locations

- Mixed at the Destined Studios, Aquarium in London, United Kingdom.

Personnel

- Matt Schwartz — writing, production, mixing, vocal recording, recording, mixing, engineering, keyboards, bass, guitar, vocoder, strings, bells, drums, FX
- Jo Perry — writing, additional backing vocals
- Cass Lowe — writing, recording, additional bells, strings, backing vocals
- Graham Archer — vocal recording
- Red Triangle — vocal recording,
- Maegan Cottone — additional backing vocals

== Charts ==
Chart (2014)	Peak position
Scottish Singles Sales (Official Charts)	40
UK Singles (Official Charts)	70
