= Mary Hammond =

English singer, actress, and voice coach

Mary Hammond is an English singer, actress, voice coach and founding Head of Musical Theatre at the Royal Academy of Music. She has also published a book titled Thank you that's all we need for today a practical guide to musical theatre auditions for actors.

== Royal Academy of Music ==
Having trained in both voice and piano at the Royal Academy of Music, Hammond has been teaching and performing in the field of musical theatre for over twenty five years. In 1994, Hammond was invited to establish a postgraduate diploma in Musical Theatre at the Royal Academy of Music, and worked as Head of Musical Theatre until 2012. She was succeeded by Björn Dobbelaere who until 2015 when he announced he was stepping down. Since 2016, the Head of Musical Theatre has been Daniel Bowling. The course has since been revised into a Master of the Arts with many alumni having success on the West End and Broadway.

== Television appearances ==
She appeared in Victoria Wood As Seen On TV, performing in sketches such as "Shopping" and "At the Chippy". She also appeared in 2008 on the ITV2 series The Passions of Girls Aloud, where she coached then Girls Aloud member Kimberley Walsh as she took on her passion away from the group to audition for a role in Les Misérables in London's West End.

She was one of the members of the United Kingdom jury at the Eurovision Song Contest 2017, and made a rather controversial decision to rank Spain, who eventually ended last, in 2nd place. However, this didn't affect the results as Spain scored 0 jury points altogether.
