= John S. Newman =

American film, television and songwriter

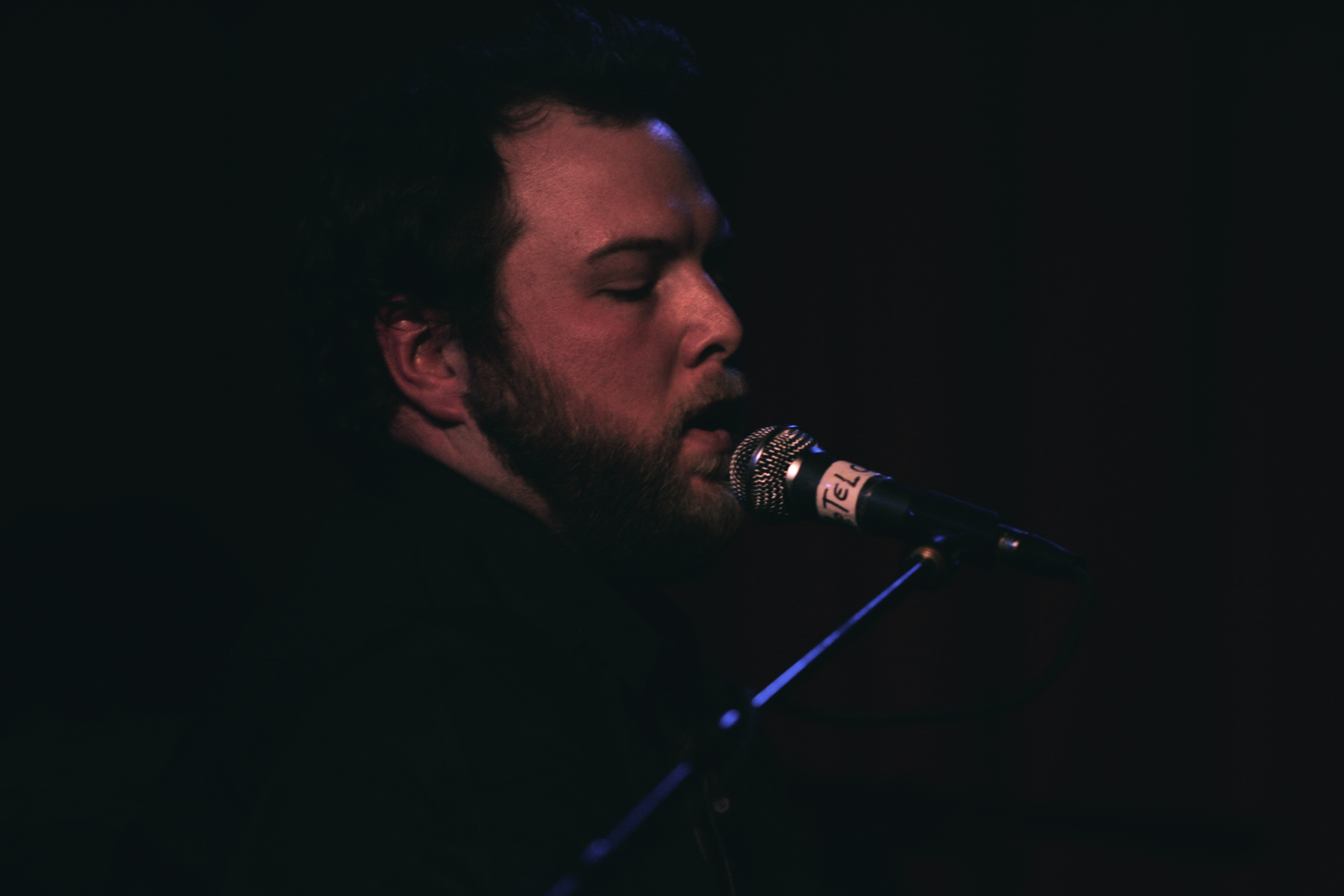

John Stuart Newman is an American film, television and songwriter. He has been mainly commended as a background writer for major television shows, winning a Daytime Emmy award for his work in Days of Our Lives.

== Television ==
Writer

- Days of Our Lives, (2003 - 2004; 2008 - 2011) is an American daytime soap opera broadcast on the NBC television network. It is one of the longest-running scripted television programs in the world, airing nearly every weekday since November 8, 1965. He won a Daytime Emmy Award for his work.
- Get Shorty, an American comedy-drama television series inspired by the 1990 novel of the same title by Elmore Leonard, and created by Davey Holmes. The first season will consist of ten episodes, and premiered on Epix on August 13, 2017. On August 23, 2017, the series was renewed for a second ten-episode season.
- Dirty Work, is a comedy web television series which debuted in 2012 and stars Jamie Clayton, Hank Harris and Mary Lynn Rajskub. John co-created the series with Aaron Shure. The series is produced by Fourth Wall Studios for their proprietary RIDES.TV platform. He won a Primetime Emmy for his work.

== Filmography ==
Writer

- Proud Mary, an upcoming American action-thriller directed by Babak Najafi, from a screenplay written by John Stuart Newman and Christian Swegal. The film will star Taraji P. Henson, Billy Brown, Danny Glover, Neal McDonough, Xander Berkeley, and Margaret Avery. The film will be released by Screen Gems on January 12, 2018.

== Song ==
Co-Writer

- "I Don't Care" by Cheryl, debuted at number one in the UK back in 2014 with 82,000 sales in its first week of release.

== Awards ==
- John won a Daytime Emmy Award for his work on Days of Our Lives.
- John won a Primetime Emmy Award for his work on Dirty Work.
