= The William Blakes =

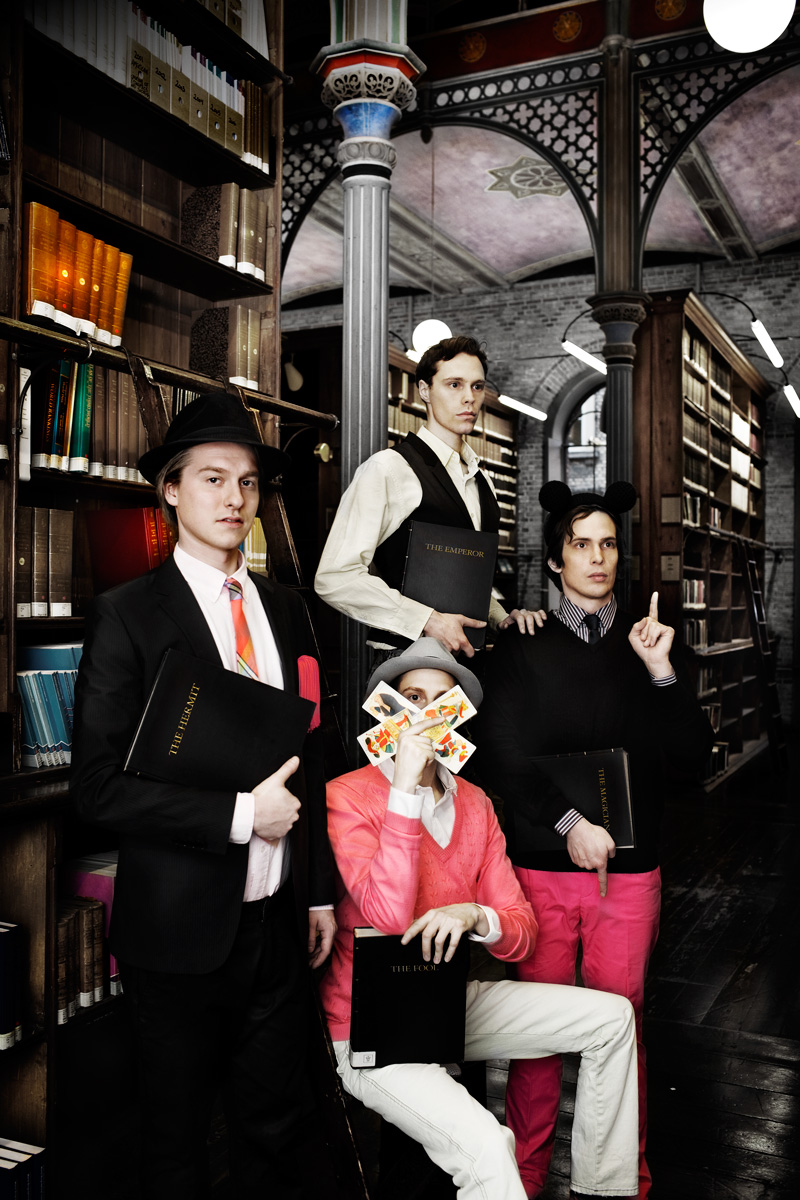
The William Blakes consists of Bo Rande, Fridolin Nordsø, Kristian Leth and Frederik Nordsø

The William Blakes is a Danish pop rock band who released their first record in 2008. The album was called 'Wayne Coyne' in an homage to the lead singer of The Flaming Lips. The band consists of drummer Fridolin Nordsø, guitarist Frederik Nordsø (the two are twins), lead singer, guitarist and song writer Kristian Leth and keyboard player / trumpet player Bo Rande.

The band has won two Danish Music Awards for 'Best Album' 2011 and 'Best Rock Group' 2011. They have also won the Danish Crown Prince and Princess' Culture Award 2012 and the Gudman Foundation Award 2012.

Bo Rande is also a member of Blue Foundation while Fridolin has produced albums for Moi Caprice, The Fashion and Choir of Young Believers and Frederik has produced albums for Outlandish and Burhan G. Kristian Leth has also written two books of poetry.

Both the debut album and the follow-up 'Dear Unknown Friend' from 2009 were recorded each in less than a week in the band's house in Sweden. In Denmark the band has received towering reviews for the albums in newspapers and music magazines.

The band created their record label Speed of Sound to release the albums. The label has since become a label that also releases albums by other artists and bands.

== Discography ==
- 'Wayne Coyne', Speed of Sound 2008
- 'Dear Unknown Friend', Speed of Sound 2009
- 'The Way Of The Warrior', Speed of Sound 2010
- 'Music Wants To Be Free', Speed of Sound 2011
- 'An Age of Wolves', Speed of Sound 2012
- 'Purple Ball', Warner Music Denmark 2014
- '1991', Warner Music Denmark 2019
- 'Europa', Speed of Sound 2020
