= The Passions of Girls Aloud =

Television series

- Starring: Girls Aloud
- Opening theme: "Can't Speak French" (Passions Mix)
- Country of origin: United Kingdom
- Original language: English
- No. of episodes: 4

Production
- Running time: 1 hour (including ads)
- Production companies: Monkey Kingdom; Globe Productions

Original release
- Network: ITV2
- Release: 14 March – 4 April 2008

Related
- Popstars: The Rivals; Girls Aloud: Home Truths; Girls Aloud: Off the Record; The Girls Aloud Party

The Passions of Girls Aloud is a four-part television series starring girl group Girls Aloud. The series premiered on ITV2 on 14 March 2008.

== Premise ==
Filmed in the autumn of 2007, the show was based around four of the members achieving something they always wanted to do, other than sing:

- Cheryl Cole attempted street dancing in Compton;
- Sarah Harding learnt polo in Argentina;
- Kimberley Walsh tried musicals in the West End;
- Nicola Roberts created her own make-up range in Taiwan.

All four episodes were narrated by British comedian and actor Mathew Horne.

== Episodes ==
=== Cheryl (14 March 2008) ===
Cole's aspiration was to be a street dancer, and she decided to audition for a part in will.i.am's video for his new single "Heartbreaker". She had received training in ballet, ballroom and tap as a child, but had never done any hip-hop or street dance. She met with choreographer Kenrick "H2O" Sandy in London for a week and learned basic street dancing with two female street dancers. She took a gymnastic lesson and also learned how to pop and lock. Cole's main problem was her lack of confidence, as she was not used to performing without Girls Aloud. She later went with bandmate Kimberley Walsh to watch Sandy and his troupe in a choreography showcase, where Sandy brought her onstage to do her first freestyle dance in front of the audience.

Later, she flew to Los Angeles with her mother Joan. After going sightseeing around Hollywood, Cole met with Kennis Marquis, Diddy's choreographer, at the Millennium Studios. He taught her about dancing with style and swagger. He took Cole shopping for hip hop fashion, so that she fit in with the L.A. street dancers. The next day, Cole headed to Compton, one of the most dangerous areas of L.A., to dance with Tommy the Clown and his friends. He taught her "krumping" and she participated in a block party. Cole danced with two professional dancers to work on her routine further the next day but began to struggle with her stamina as the intense dance training and jet lag took its toll on her.

After briefly flying back to the UK, Cole returned to Los Angeles to practice her routine with choreographer Tracy Phillips before she auditioned for the video in front of will.i.am and got the part. Cole also contributed vocals to the UK radio edit of the song, which was used for the video. At the video shoot, Cole watched will.i.am film his solo scenes, and filmed her duet scenes with him. She then performed her routine in front of the camera, but began to doubt the quality of her performance after filming concluded. The episode ends two weeks later with an advance screening of the music video, which Sandy as well as Cole's bandmates, family and friends all attended. Her performance was applauded, and she reflected positively on her street dancing experience.

=== Sarah (21 March 2008) ===
Harding's aspiration was to play polo. During the show, Sarah trained in the United Kingdom and Argentina.

Harding had a love of horseback riding, but her skills were "rusty". She learned the basics of polo while practicing in the UK. Whilst in Argentina, Harding was set to compete in a polo competition against a successful polo team, but due to weather issues, the match was cancelled and Harding flew back home. Luckily for her, a British polo competition was available for her to take part in. Harding completed her passion when she competed against some of the best polo players across the world during a British game. Band members Cole, Walsh and Nadine Coyle came to support her.

During the game, Harding suffered from a lack of oxygen and fell off the horse. Although she did not sustain any major injuries, she insisted that she could not remember what had happened, causing her mentor and the coach to pull her out due to scares about her health if she continued. At first, Harding was distraught about this, but support from her fellow band members and family cheered her up, and she resolved not to give up and to try polo again in the future.

=== Kimberley (28 March 2008) ===
Walsh decided to audition for a West End production of Les Misérables. She trained in both London and New York City.

Walsh met with vocal coach Mary Hammond in London, notorious for being difficult. She had less than a week to practice for her audition, in which she sang Éponine's solo number "On My Own". The producers of the show cast her as a whore in the song "Lovely Ladies", and she would also perform an encore of "On My Own" in character. After flying to Los Angeles for two days for the "Call the Shots" video shoot, Walsh then flew to New York City to practice with Broadway vocal coach Liz Caplan, as well as meet Les Misérables Broadway coach Michael Pizarro who helped her act through facial expressions and body language. Walsh returned to London to rehearse for a week before the show, but the onset of jet lag combined with the intense vocal training strained her voice which led to rehearsals being halted two days before the show. On the morning of the show, Walsh participated in a dress rehearsal with the rest of the cast, and had to perform "On My Own" in front of them. On the night of the show, her family, Steven Ansell, and Cole came to watch her perform.

Walsh stated in an interview with Metro that the experience was hard because "the range for musicals is huge and you have to sing everything clearly. I haven't used my upper register for years."

=== Nicola (4 April 2008) ===
Roberts had a passion for many years to create her own foundation for girls with fair skin like herself. Roberts, who had been using tanning products since her time on Popstars: The Rivals to look "normal" out of peer pressure, had recently begun to embrace her natural pale skin colour, but struggled to find foundations that matched her skin.

Roberts proved her point by going to a high street store, where there were no foundations for girls with such pale complexion. She met with two directors from Jelly Pong Pong, a cosmetics company. They told Roberts that creating a make-up range in two months could be difficult. They called in some favours, and Roberts went to Taiwan to test out various textures and shades. She personally made these decisions, and took a tour of the factory where her range was created.

Once back in the UK, she met with fashion events producer Lee Lapthorne who helped her arrange a launch party for the press, her family, and her friends to take place in four weeks and gave her creative control. Both Roberts and Lapthorne toured several potential venues for the event, but after Roberts was uninspired, Lapthorne sent her to attend Julien McDonald's fashion show, where Roberts faced the press but received encouragement from bandmate Cole once inside. Roberts and Lapthorne then spent weeks selecting models with fair skin complexion and organizing the launch, and four days before the event she was able to test out the finalized make-up range from Taiwan, and was pleased with the results on her skin. However, the next day Lapthorne remained concerned about how Roberts would present her passion to the press, and suggested she do a speech for them at the end of the event. Roberts then invited Cole and fellow bandmate Walsh to her house who provided her with moral support.

On the morning of the launch at London's Sketch, Roberts and Lapthorne hurried to set up set dressings and make-up and guide their models for the event. Walsh and Cole attended the launch, where Roberts told her press about her skincare passion and encouraging others to embrace their natural skin colors, and was met with rousing applause from the audience.

Dainty Doll, Roberts' make-up range, was released on 18 April 2008. The foundation was praised by The Times, which said that it "sinks in instantly, leaving a velvety second skin."

== Controversy ==
Unlike the other four members of the band, Nadine Coyle chose not to take part in the programme. Coyle was initially going to conduct an orchestra, but pulled out due to the programme's bosses refusing to let her change her passion project to being a charity worker in Bolivia. Sarah Harding later stated in an interview that Coyle was simply more reserved than the rest of the band, and did not enjoy taking part in reality shows.

As a part of Passions, the Girls Aloud website posted a competition called "Be A Model for Nicola", which was meant to give one fan the chance to model for Nicola Roberts as part of her final task. However, it was later revealed that the winner would actually be attending the show and getting a makeover by Roberts. Roberts said that she tried to stick to her word, but the production company had the final decision.
