= Love Made Me Do It (song) =

Single by Cheryl
- Released: 9 November 2018
- Genre: Pop
- Length: 3:27
- Label: 3 Beat
- Songwriters: Dylan Cooper; George Astasio; Jason Pebworth; Jon Shave; Nicola Roberts; Natasha Bedingfield; Miranda Cooper; Cheryl Tweedy; Kylie Minogue
- Producers: The Invisible Men; Dylan Cooper

Cheryl singles chronology
"Only Human" (2015)	"Love Made Me Do It" (2018)	"Let You" (2019)

Music video
- Love Made Me Do It on YouTube

"Love Made Me Do It" is a song by English singer Cheryl. It was released on 9 November 2018 as the intended lead single to her unreleased fifth studio album through 3 Beat Records, following its premiere on Capital FM. "Love Made Me Do It" is a pop song written by Cheryl, Nicola Roberts, Natasha Bedingfield, Kylie Minogue and Miranda Cooper, as well as its producers The Invisible Men and Dylan Cooper. Lyrically, it speaks of Cheryl's failed relationships and how easy she finds it to fall in love. The song debuted at number 19 on the UK Singles Chart and spent one week in the Top 40. The accompanying music video was directed by Sophie Muller and shows the singer dancing with alternative camera shots and cuts.

== Background and composition ==
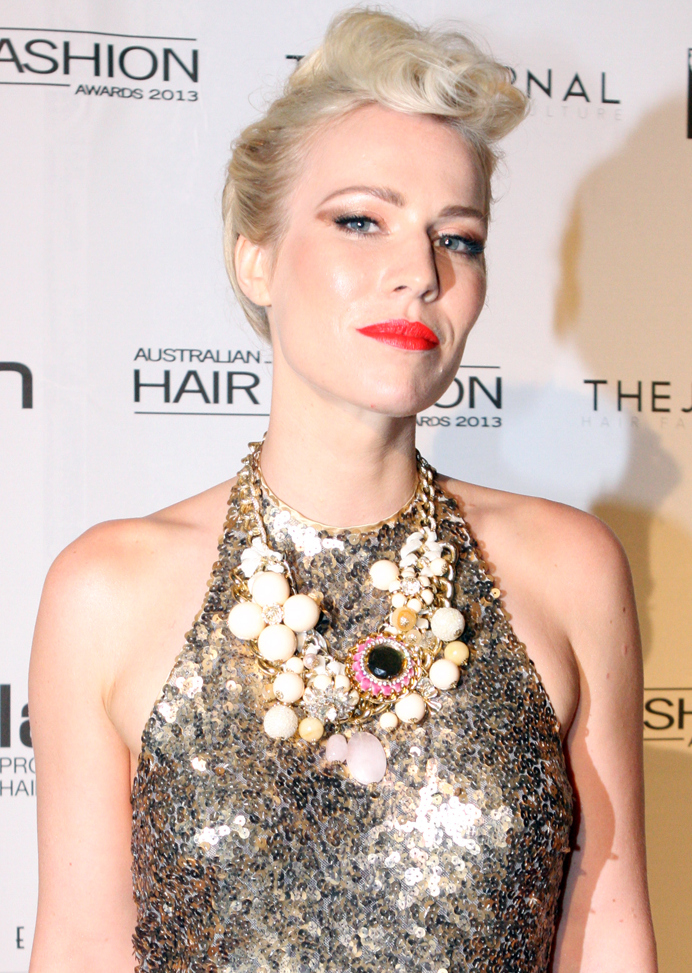
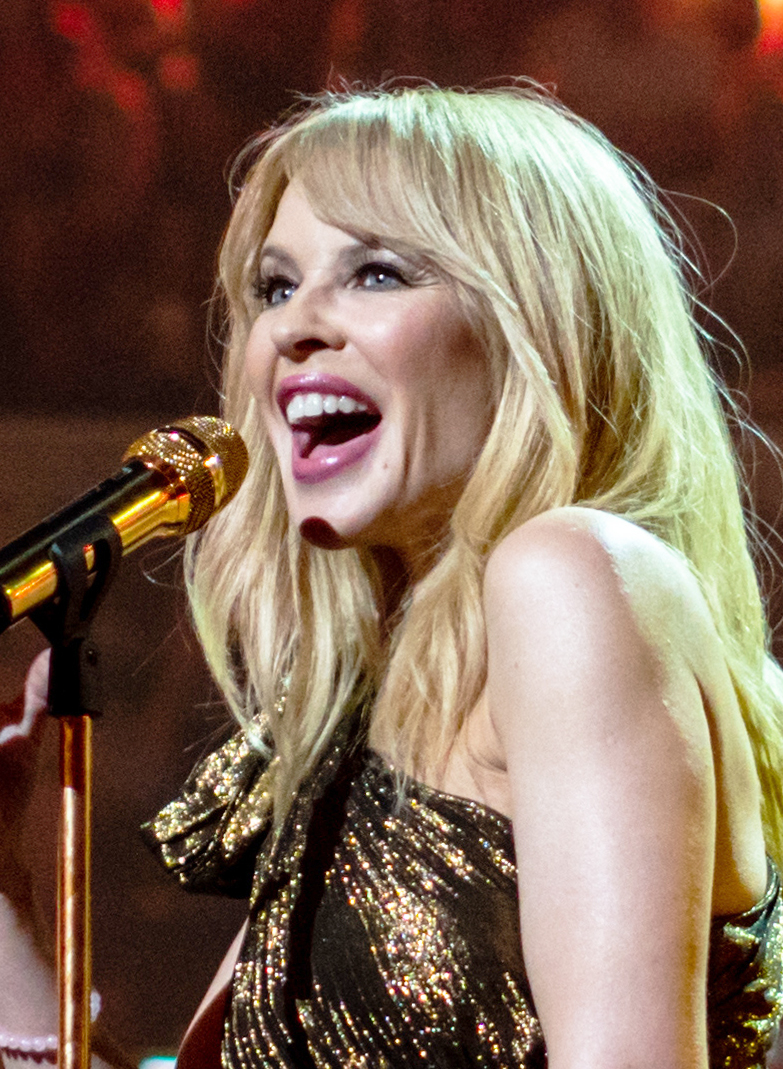
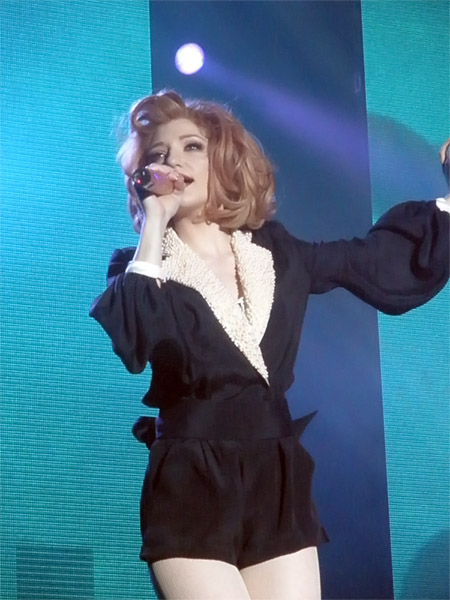
Natasha Bedingfield (left), Kylie Minogue (middle) and Cheryl's former Girls Aloud colleague Nicola Roberts (right) were co-writers of the song.

In June 2018, almost four years after the release of her fourth studio album, Only Human (2014), Cheryl announced that her fifth studio album, which she wrote alongside Naughty Boy and her former Girls Aloud bandmate Nicola Roberts, was "pretty much finished". "Love Made Me Do It" is Cheryl's first release with 3 Beat Records. Co-written by Roberts, Kylie Minogue, Natasha Bedingfield, The Invisible Men, Dylan Cooper and Miranda Cooper, the song is written about Cheryl's failed relationships, with lyrics such as "Oh my God / I'm such a sucker / I fall in love with every fucker" speaking of how easily she falls in love. Speaking of the writing process on Jessie Ware's podcast Table Manners, Cheryl stated:

[Nicola's] written for me in the past. When she started songwriting, she would send things she's done and I'd say, 'That's awesome, I'll have that.' And not long after I had [my son], I was like, 'I love this, I love that, so let's just do it.' She knows me inside out and she can speak for me and melodies are just first-take wonders.

== Music video ==
Prior to the song's release, teasers of the accompanying music video, directed by Sophie Muller, were posted on Cheryl's Instagram account. The song was released on 9 November 2018, with the music video being uploaded on Cheryl's YouTube account the same day. The video features the singer performing with multiple dancers, with alternative camera shots and cuts.

== Critical reception ==
Laura Klonowski from CelebMix positively described "Love Made Me Do It" as a "pop anthem", saying that the singer "[is] sounding better than ever". Klonowski compared Cheryl's vocals to those of Selena Gomez, saying "it's unlike anything we have heard from her before", and deemed the song "a fresh take on the pop genre" and "a massive banger that promises to become the major earworm of 2018". Daniel Welsh of HuffPost found the song to be "a bold, and surprisingly fun, return to pop", describing it as "Cheryl's most personal single to date". Welsh criticised the lack of "experimentation", but concluded that "[Cheryl has] tapped into something brilliant, and it sounds effortless as a result."

== Chart performance ==
On 16 November 2018, "Love Made Me Do It" debuted and peaked at number 19 on the UK Singles Chart, dropping to number 48 a week later. The song debuted at number 2 on the Scottish Singles Chart and at number 32 on the Irish Singles Chart.

== Live performances ==
Cheryl performed the song live for the first time on The X Factor on 18 November 2018. The performance was widely criticised in the media, with viewers arguing that it was of an "overtly sexual nature" and was "inappropriate" for pre-watershed television. Regulatory authority Ofcom later confirmed that they were "assessing" numerous complaints about the performance and were "deciding whether or not to investigate". Additionally, Cheryl was criticised for her live vocals during the performance, although some noted that she has been equally slated for lip syncing. Cheryl performed the song on 25 November 2018 at the Manchester Arena as part of Hits Radio Live, on The Graham Norton Show on 30 November, at The O_{2} Arena as part of the Jingle Bell Ball on 9 December, on Michael McIntyre's Big Show on 15 December and as part of her setlist at Manchester Pride in August 2019.

== Personnel ==
Credits adapted from Tidal and Universal Music.

- Cheryl Tweedy – vocals, composition, lyrics
- Kylie Minogue – composition, lyrics
- Natasha Bedingfield – composition, lyrics
- Nicola Roberts – composition, lyrics
- Jason Pebworth – composition, lyrics
- Jon Shave – composition, lyrics, programming
- George Astasio – composition, lyrics, programming
- Dylan Cooper – composition, lyrics, programming
- Miranda Cooper – composition, lyrics
- Phil Tan – mixing
- Joe LaPorta – mixing

== Charts ==
Chart (2018)	Peak position
Ireland (IRMA)	32
Scotland Singles (OCC)	2
UK Singles (OCC)	19

== Release history ==
Region	Date	Format	Label	Ref.
Various	9 November 2018	Digital download; streaming	3 Beat	
United Kingdom	9 November 2018	Contemporary hit radio	3 Beat	
