= I Don't Care (Cheryl song) =

Single by Cheryl

from the album Only Human
- Released: 2 November 2014
- Recorded: 2014
- Studio: Apmammann Studio, Stockholm
- Genre: Dance-pop
- Length: 4:00
- Label: Polydor
- Songwriters: Jocke Åhlund; Bonnie McKee; John Stuart Newman; Cheryl
- Producers: Jocke Åhlund; Oligee; Red Triangle; Mellatron

Cheryl singles chronology
| "Crazy Stupid Love" (2014) | "I Don't Care" (2014) | "Only Human" (2015) |

"I Don't Care" is a song recorded by English singer Cheryl from her fourth studio album, Only Human (2014). It was co-written by Jocke Åhlund, Bonnie McKee, John Stuart Newman and Cheryl, and was produced by Åhlund and Oliver "Oligee" Goldstein. The song was released on 2 November 2014 through Polydor Records as the second single from the album. Musically, "I Don't Care" is a pop and dance song, which features breezy synthesizers and pumping bassline and lyrically sees Cheryl taking on a dismissive attitude to former lovers and critics.

Upon its release, "I Don't Care" received positive reviews from contemporary music critics, who praised its production and commended Cheryl's choice to depart from overproduced songs. The song was a commercial success, debuting at number one on the UK Singles Chart, giving Cheryl her fifth number-one single as a solo artist, and making her the first British female solo artist to do this, overtaking then current record sharers Geri Halliwell and Rita Ora. Additionally, it is the ninth number-one single of her entire career, including those from when she was part of British-Irish girl group Girls Aloud.

An accompanying music video for "I Don't Care" was directed by past collaborator Colin Tilley in August 2014 in Málaga, Spain. The video depicts Cheryl on the beach, dancing on a cliff top and on a luxury boat. The music video was met with mixed reviews, with some calling it fearless and others calling Cheryl's attitude disappointing. To further promote the single, Cheryl performed it on The X Factor eleventh series' results show on 2 November 2014; the performance was questioned by fans and critics, who accused Cheryl of miming.

== Background ==
"It was potentially going to be the first track but I didn't want to open it with it because of how it can be taken. I mean, of course I care about things - you know people and stuff - but it was more I didn't want to open the album with that message".

— Cheryl explaining why she was worried on the carefree nature of "I Don't Care".

Following the release of Cheryl's third studio album, A Million Lights, in June 2012 and embarking on her debut solo headlining tour, Cheryl confirmed that a Girls Aloud's reunion would occur in November 2012. The group released their second greatest hits compilation, Ten on 26 November 2012 and In 2013, the group embarked on Ten: The Hits Tour. In March 2013, following the completion of the tour, Girls Aloud released a statement via their official Twitter to confirm that they were splitting permanently.

On 30 September 2014, Cheryl announced that "I Don't Care" would receive its radio debut on the following day, 1 October on Capital FM, serving as the second single from her fourth studio album Only Human. That same day, she revealed the single's artwork through Instagram; it sees Cheryl with her head in her hand and laughing while sat on a chair. It also gave a glimpse of her rose tattoo. While being interviewed by Capital FM, Cheryl told that "A lot of the time I'm on set, so I had a lot of freedom. [...] ['I Don't Care'] it sums up pretty much how I feel right now. [It's] very pop, but fun pop!" "I Don't Care" was officially released as the second single from Only Human on 2 November 2014.

== Composition ==
"I Don't Care"
A 24-second sample of the song's chorus features Cheryl singing over pop and dance background.

"I Don't Care" is a pop and dance song which lyrically finds Cheryl singing "It feels so fucking good to say, I swear that I don't care". Idolator website editor Bianca Gracie noted that the song carries "an 80s carefree vibe to it, thanks to the breezy synths and pumping bass line", and in contrast to her other songs like "Ghetto Baby", there are no "massive bass drops or an in-your-face dance theme". According to journalist Harriet Gibsone from The Guardian, the song had the same energy as Erasure's song "A Little Respect" (1988). EntertainmentWise commented that "I Don't Care" "sums up the underlying message of the whole project quite nicely". According to Lewis Corner from Digital Spy, the song showcases Cheryl's new-found "F-You" attitude in a "spectrum of rasping electronics, jump-around beats and a massive middle-finger chorus". He considered that the lyrics were directed "at a collective of former love rats, keyboard warriors and sensationalised headlines". Songwriter Bonnie McKee has revealed the song, originally titled "Waking Up Diagonal" after the opening lyric, had been originally written for herself to perform, given the lyrics drew from McKee's life experiences. Along the way, Cheryl and songwriters changed some lyrics and changed the title to "I Don't Care.

== Critical reception ==
"I Don't Care" received mostly positive reviews from contemporary music critics. Harriet Gibsone, while writing for The Guardian newspaper called it a "bombastic pop blast teetering on the edge of ridiculousness. [...] Song of the year". While reviewing Only Human for the same publication, Caroline Sullivan also gave a positive review and described it as an "actual radio-ready chorus to I Don't Care [which has] a jaunty bit of Casio-pop". Bianca Gracie from Idolator website gave a positive review for the song, stating that on the current "haze of over-produc[ed songs], it's actually quite refreshing", and emphasising that Cheryl's vocals "shine" in the song. Matthew Horton, while reviewing Only Human during its week of release for Virgin Media, commented that "the utterly addictive bounce of new single I Don't Care is an equally striking departure [from her previous releases], and not just because she's swearing her head off", in relation to its lyrics.

Popjustice rated it eight stars, out of ten. EntertainmentWise website noted that "I Don't Care" was a particular highlight from the album. However, Edwin McFee from Hot Press gave a negative review for the album, and called "I Don't Care" a "club-tinged plastic pop song". Bradley Stern of MuuMuse said that the song "undeservedly stole the crown from Geri Halliwell" for most British female number-one singles. Kim Gregory from Now magazine wrote a negative review for the song, criticizing the Auto-Tune usage and repetition of the line "I don't care".

== Chart performance ==
In the United Kingdom, "I Don't Care" debuted at number one with 82,000 sales in its first week of release, as predicted by mid-week sales data. In doing so, Cheryl achieved her ninth number-one single (including those from Girls Aloud), and fifth as a solo artist, therefore becoming the British female artist with the most solo UK number ones at the time, overtaking previous record sharers Geri Halliwell, Rita Ora and herself. It additionally peaked at number one in Scotland. "I Don't Care" debuted at number 92 on Flanders' Ultratip chart in Belgium on the issue dated 8 November 2014. The next week, it reached number 82.

== Music video ==
The accompanying music video for "I Don't Care" was directed by Colin Tilley in August 2014 in Málaga, Spain. The pair had previously collaborated on previous single "Crazy Stupid Love". The same month, the singer teased her followers on social media with pictures from the video. It starts with a honey-skinned Cheryl skipping around a beach with long locks and smiling, wearing oversized woolly jumper. In another scene, Cheryl is on a luxury boat with a group of friends in a white crop-top, denim shorts and bright pink sunglasses. During the video she also dances in a yellow crop-top, while shots of her on top of a cliff are also shown. At one point, the singer is in a bed wearing nothing but a white shirt and smudged eyeliner, with glimpses of black, lace underwear underneath, and looks directly into the camera and mouthing "zero fucks given".

The music video received mixed reviews from critics. Kim Gregory from Now magazine provided a negative review for the video, pointing out her "dodgy" outfits and makeup, and stating she was disappointed with Cheryl's entire attitude in the video.

== Live performance ==
Cheryl performed "I Don't Care" on The X Factor eleventh series' results show on 2 November 2014, where she is also a judge. Following the performance, fans and critics alike accused the singer of miming during her set. Reportedly, the 3,300 lights used as a backdrop during the performance caused a 66-year-old viewer to have an epileptic seizure.

== Remixes ==
One Direction member Liam Payne remixed "I Don't Care" under his DJ alter ego Payno. Cheryl publicly thanked the singer for the remix version, and it was included on "I Don't Care"'s remix EP, under the title "Payno Vs. Afterhrs Remix". Four other remixes were available through the EP.

== Track listing ==
- Digital download
1. "I Don't Care" – 4:00
- Digital download – The Remixes
1. "I Don't Care" – 4:03
2. "I Don't Care" (Payno Vs. Afterhrs Remix) – 3:58
3. "I Don't Care" (Sonic Matta Club Edit) – 5:38
4. "I Don't Care" (Cahill Club Mix) – 6:33
5. "I Don't Care" (TIEKS Remix) – 5:42
6. "I Don't Care" (Clutch Real Club Mix) – 6:28

== Credits and personnel ==
Credits are taken from the Only Human liner notes.

Locations

- Recorded at Apmammann Studio, Stockholm, Sweden; mixed at MixStar Studios in Virginia Beach, Virginia

Personnel

- Cheryl Tweedy — vocals, writing
- Jocke Åhlund — writing, production, recording, original vocal production, synthesizer, programming
- Bonnie McKee — writing
- John Newman — writing
- Oligge — co-production, programming, additional synthesizer
- Figge Bostrǒn — recording
- Red Triangle — vocal recording, vocal production
- Mellatron — original vocal production,
- Maegan Cottone — backing vocals
- George Tizzard — backing vocals
- Rick Parkhouse — backing vocals
- Serban Ghenea — mixing
- John Hanes — mixing

== Charts ==
| Chart (2014) | Peak position |
|---|---|
| Belgium (Ultratip Bubbling Under Flanders) | 82 |
| Belgium (Ultratip Bubbling Under Wallonia) | 19 |
| Czech Republic Airplay (ČNS IFPI) | 30 |
| Ireland (IRMA) | 4 |
| Romania (Airplay 100) | 81 |
| Scottish Singles Sales (Official Charts) | 1 |
| Slovakia Airplay (ČNS IFPI) | 58 |
| UK Singles (Official Charts) | 1 |

== Certifications ==
| Region | Certification | Certified units/sales |
|---|---|---|
| United Kingdom (BPI) | Gold | 400,000^{‡} |
^{‡} Sales+streaming figures based on certification alone.

== See also ==
- List of number-one hits of 2014 (Scotland)
- List of UK Singles Chart number ones of the 2010s
