= Messy Little Raindrops =

Studio album by Cheryl Cole
- Released: 29 October 2010
- Recorded: February–September 2010
- Studios: Sub Zero Studios; NightBird Recording Studios; SARM Studios; Chalice Recording Studios
- Genres: Pop; dance-pop; R&B
- Length: 43:55
- Labels: Fascination; Polydor
- Producers: Wayne Wilkins; Starsmith; will.i.am; Antwoine "T-Wiz" Collins; Steve Kipner; Free School; Al Shux; J. R. Rotem

Cheryl Cole chronology
3 Words (2009)	Messy Little Raindrops (2010)	A Million Lights (2012)

Singles from Messy Little Raindrops
- 1. "Promise This" Released: 24 October 2010; 2. "The Flood" Released: 2 January 2011

Messy Little Raindrops is the second studio album by English singer Cheryl Cole, released on 29 October 2010 by Fascination Records. The project is the follow-up to Cole's multi-platinum debut solo album 3 Words (2009), following seven successful years as a member of girl group Girls Aloud. Recorded in Los Angeles and London, Cheryl mainly worked with Wayne Wilkins, who previously produced Cole's number one debut single "Fight for This Love".

The album has a dance-pop sound much like Cole's previous album. It received generally mixed reviews from contemporary music critics. It was preceded by the lead single, "Promise This", which peaked at number one in Ireland and the UK.

The album debuted at number one in the UK becoming her second to do so, and at number two in Ireland. On 19 August 2011 the album was certified Platinum by BPI, with shipments in the UK in the excess of 300,000.

== Background and development ==
Messy Little Raindrops is the follow-up to Cole's multi-platinum debut solo album 3 Words (2009), and comes in the aftermath of Cole's divorce from footballer Ashley Cole and her life-threatening battle with malaria. Cole started recording sessions for her second album in February 2010 though in an interview on Alan Carr: Chatty Man she admitted that some of the songs submitted for the record dated back to 3 Words (2009). Recording continued in Los Angeles while Cole recuperated from malaria. Cole described the album as "more exciting, very personal, very me", combining pop, R&B, and dance-pop sounds. The album was largely produced by Wayne Wilkins, who previously produced Cole's number one debut solo single "Fight for This Love" and the album track "Rain on Me". Cole also reunited with will.i.am, who was the executive producer of 3 Words. American producer J. R. Rotem contributed "Better to Lie", while Cole worked with British electronic musician Starsmith, Al Shux, and Free School for the first time. Messy Little Raindrops features guest vocals from August Rigo, Dizzee Rascal, Travie McCoy, and will.i.am.

The album's title is taken from a lyric in the song "Raindrops"; "And now love can grow without tiny little raindrops. Tiny little, tiny little, messy little raindrops." Cole said, "when it rains, everything she's washed [...] it feels hopeful." Cole is seen in a bright pink and orange off-the-shoulder dress and five-inch animal print Christian Louboutin heels on the album cover, which was unveiled on 14 October 2010. It also features the album title and her name scrawled in orange text. Cole's barbed-wire and rose tattoo, located on her right thigh, was airbrushed out of the shot.

== Composition ==
"Promise This", the album's lead single, serves as the opening track. Produced by Wayne Wilkins, it has been described as an "upbeat, pop track" with "more of a dance feel than previous releases". The song "finds her contemplating mortality with a cheerful morbidity, asking for prayers over a brutal march beat." Tabloids suggested that the lyrics were based upon her divorce from footballer Ashley Cole, and how her dancer friend Derek Hough nursed her to health while she was suffering from malaria. This is unlikely however, as Cole did not write the lyrics to this song. The song is followed by "Yeah Yeah", which was produced by Starsmith and features a rap from Travie McCoy. It has received comparisons to Madonna's Confessions on a Dancefloor (2005) era. "Live Tonight", produced by will.i.am, includes a "Beach Boys-go-native breakdown completing the tug on the collective houseinflected heartstrings" and "a blissful synth line". According to Simon Price, "Live Tonight" is a "piece of sub-Lauper skinny-tie pop/rock which will have the writers of Rod Stewart's "Young Turks" consulting their lawyers." The album's fourth track and second single, "The Flood", was described by X magazine as an "enormo-ballad" and "a massive, strong-laden, Christmassy tear-jerker about 'wreckage', 'drowning' and 'natural disaster love'". It received comparisons to Natalie Imbruglia.

"Amnesia" was initially rumoured to be a Britney Spears cover from that singer's 2008 album, Circus; however, it is an original track produced by Wilkins and Steve Kipner. It was described as "bhangra-flavoured". "Everyone", also produced by Wilkins, features guest vocals from British rapper Dizzee Rascal and offers "serious soulful uplift". Cole cited the song's lyrics as her favourite. "Raindrops" is a ballad produced by Free School. "Hummingbird" was co-written and produced by Al Shux. It "recalls a subtle version of Beyoncé's 'Halo'". "Better to Lie" was produced by J. R. Rotem and features guest vocals from August Rigo. It received comparisons to Keri Hilson's "Knock You Down". "Let's Get Down" was produced by and featuring will.i.am. It samples "I.O.U." by Freeez. It was called "a celebratory jam aimed firmly at Friday night" and "a Freeze-sampling electro-stomper that makes the Geordie lass sound almost New York cool." "Happy Tears" is "acoustic-based pop". It was produced by Wilkins. The album's closing track "Waiting" was co-written by American singer Kelis and produced by Free School.

== Critical reception ==
Professional ratings
Review scores
Source	Rating
AllMusic	4/5 stars
Daily Mirror	3/5 stars
The Daily Telegraph	3/5 stars
Entertainment.ie	2.5/5 stars
The Guardian	3/5 stars
The Independent	2/5 stars
NME	2/10
Virgin Media	3/5 stars

Messy Little Raindrops received mixed reviews from music critics. A predominantly positive review came from Jon O'Brien of AllMusic who awarded it four out of five stars, saying that "Messy Little Raindrops is a cohesive and adventurous follow-up that will undoubtedly continue [Cole's] ascent into pop's premier league", and praising the songs "Promise This", "Amnesia" and "Happy Tears". Tom Hocknell of BBC Music was generally positive, labeling Messy Little Raindrops a "competent and frequently enjoyable pop album". Johnny Dee of Virgin Media noticed that with Messy Little Raindrops Cole is "returning to base" and described it as "good, clean, family-friendly fun". The Daily Mirror also gave three stars, noting an improvement from 3 Words as well as Cole's perseverance. Critics noted a large amount of filler. Lisa Wright of Dotmusic said, "if there are no hooks, no catchy melody or at least something to put a swagger in your step then you're left with a song that's lyrically obvious and musically banal - and no-one wants that [...] Of course it's not all bad and 'Messy Little Raindrops' still shines with moments of pop brilliance."

The album was criticised for its lack of creativity and personality. Hugh Montgomery of The Observer called the album "a serious disappointment". Although he saw an improvement from 3 Words, Montgomery felt the album did not live up to "the Xenomania-directed wizardry of her Girls Aloud oeuvre". Maddy Costa of The Guardian wrote further, "Coming from a member of one of the most forward-looking pop acts of the 21st century, Messy Little Raindrops feels curiously dated." It received two stars out of five from Andy Gill of The Independent, who wrote that "Cole delve[s] further into her experience for Messy Little Raindrops; sadly, most of the album simply continues its predecessor's tedious romantic arguments, with only a couple of songs drawing on her more traumatic illness." Simon Gage of the Daily Express commented that "even by her standards this second solo outing is phoned in." A review from The Scotsman agreed, criticizing the album as "a reasonable pop record that has had all the personality produced right out of it." Simon Price, also from The Independent, was overwhelmingly negative. He summarised, "Messy Little Raindrops is music for yoghurt adverts, with lyrics for people who get their emotional vocabulary from Take a Break and Loose Women." A negative review from NME said, "Unsurprisingly, we're not mad for Chezza's manufactured conveyor-belt-drivel" and commented that in "time when the likes of Janelle Monáe are creating brilliant futuristic pop, it's surely time to send Cole back to Newcastle". Entertainment.ie's Jenny Mulligan describes Messy Little Raindrops as being "more club-friendly" and as "a pop album with a few banging singles and a lot of filler".

The album was nominated as the worst album of the year by NME.

== Singles ==
"Promise This" was premiered on Chris Moyles' BBC Radio 1 breakfast show on 14 September, where it was introduced as the lead single from Messy Little Raindrops. The video for the song was directed by Sophie Muller and was debuted on 21 September 2010 on UK television channel ITV2. On 24 October, Cole performed "Promise This" on The X Factor's results show. She donned a white tuxedo jacket, "frilly black knickers", knee-high zebra print tights, and leather boots and was joined by multiple back-up dancers. The song was released on 25 October 2010 and charted at number one on the Irish and UK Singles Charts. It became the fastest-selling single of 2010 in the UK.

"The Flood" is the second and final single from the album. The music video premiered 24 November 2010 and the physical single was released 3 January 2011. Cole performed "The Flood" on The Royal Variety Performance 2010. She also performed the track along an acoustic version of "Promise This" on Alan Carr: Chatty Man. The song entered the charts after its official release at number 18, becoming Cheryl's lowest charting single in the UK to date. "Everyone", featuring Dizzee Rascal, was slated as the third single and was to be released on 21 March 2011, but was cancelled due to Cheryl's involvement on the US version of The X Factor and the underperformance of "The Flood".

== Promotion ==
=== Marketing ===
In addition to her role as a judge on The X Factor, Cheryl Cole made a high-profile appearance on Piers Morgan's Life Stories, in which she discussed her marriage and divorce with Ashley Cole and her life-threatening battle with malaria. The show's ratings reached an all-time high. Polydor Records worked with advertising firm MediaCom to create various marketing strategies to promote the album, such as the usage of Facebook Places. Billboard posters invited fans to check into the nearest poster using Facebook Places on their smartphone, to win tickets, travel and hotel for a recording of The X Factor.

=== Live performances ===
On 24 October, Cole performed "Promise This" on The X Factor's results show. She donned a white tuxedo jacket, "frilly black knickers", knee-high zebra print tights, and leather boots and was joined by multiple back-up dancers. She "showcased her vocal and dancing skills with an energetic, raunchy routine that earned a standing ovation from her fellow judges." Similar to her 2009 performance of "Fight for This Love" on The X Factor, the media speculated whether Cole lip synced or not.

"The Flood" was performed at the 82nd annual Royal Variety Performance, held at the London Palladium theatre with Charles, Prince of Wales and Camilla, Duchess of Cornwall in attendance. She wore a gown from Roberto Cavalli's spring 2011 collection with jewelry by David Morris.

Cole also performed on the 20 December 2010 episode of Alan Carr: Chatty Man, singing "The Flood" and an acoustic version of "Promise This".

== Track listing ==
Messy Little Raindrops track listing
No.	Title	Writer(s)	Producer(s)	Length
1.	"Promise This"	Priscilla Renea; Wayne Wilkins; Christopher Jackson	Wilkins	3:22
2.	"Yeah Yeah" (featuring Travie McCoy)	Fin Dow-Smith; Wayne Hector; McCoy	Starsmith	3:16
3.	"Live Tonight"	William Adams; Cheryl Cole	will.i.am	3:30
4.	"The Flood"	Hamilton; Wilkins	Wilkins; Antwoin "T-Wiz" Collins	3:57
5.	"Amnesia"	Steve Kipner; Wilkins; Tamara Savage	Wilkins; Kipner	3:43
6.	"Everyone" (featuring Dizzee Rascal)	Andre Merritt; Wilkins; Collins; Dylan Mills	Wilkins; T-Wiz	3:59
7.	"Raindrops"	Jean-Baptiste; Hamilton; Alain Whyte; Michael McHenry; Nick Marsh; Ryan Buendia	Free School	3:31
8.	"Hummingbird"	Al Shuckburgh; Hamilton	Shux	3:12
9.	"Better to Lie" (featuring August Rigo)	J. R. Rotem; Rigo	J. R. Rotem	3:29
10.	"Let's Get Down" (featuring will.i.am)	Adams; Cole	will.i.am	3:51
11.	"Happy Tears"	Nasri Atweh; Wilkins; Collins	Wilkins; T-Wiz	3:54
12.	"Waiting"	Baptiste; McHenry; Marsh; Buendia; Kelis	Free School	4:09
Total length:				43:55

International bonus tracks
No.	Title	Writer(s)	Producer(s)	Length
13.	"Fight for This Love"	Kipner, Wilkins, Merrit	Wilkins, Kipner	3:46
14.	"3 Words" (featuring will.i.am)	Adams, George Pajon, Cole	will.i.am	4:36
15.	"Parachute"	Ingrid Michaelson, Marshall Altman	Syience	3:42

iTunes bonus video
No.	Title	Length
13.	"On the Road with Cheryl Cole"	24:25

Sample credits

- "Let's Get Down" contains a sample of the recording "I.O.U" as performed and written by Freeez.
- "Waiting" contains a sample of the recording "A Thousand Miles" as performed and written by Vanessa Carlton.

== Charts ==
=== Weekly charts ===
Weekly chart performance for Messy Little Raindrops
Chart (2010)	Peak position
European Top 100 Albums (Billboard)	7
Irish Albums (IRMA)	2
Scottish Albums (Official Charts)	2
UK Albums (Official Charts)	1

=== Year-end charts ===
Year-end chart performance for Messy Little Raindrops
Chart (2010)	Position
UK Albums (OCC)	21

== Certifications ==
Certifications for Messy Little Raindrops
Region	Certification	Certified units/sales
Ireland (IRMA)	Platinum	15,000^{^}
United Kingdom (BPI)	Platinum	300,000^{^}
^{^} Shipments figures based on certification alone.

== See also ==
- List of 2010 albums
- List of UK Albums Chart number ones of the 2010s
