= Let You =

Single by Cheryl
- Released: 31 May 2019
- Genre: Electropop
- Length: 2:46
- Label: 3 Beat
- Songwriter(s): Cheryl Tweedy; Chiara Hunter; Danny Casio; George Astasio; Jason Pebworth; Jon Shave; Nicola Roberts
- Producer(s): Mike Spencer

Cheryl singles chronology
"Love Made Me Do It" (2018)	"Let You" (2019)

Music video
- Let You on YouTube

"Let You" is a song by English singer Cheryl, released by 3 Beat Records on 31 May 2019 and is her most recent release as of 2025. It was released as an intended second single off her then-upcoming fifth studio album, which was never released. Cheryl wrote the song with Chiara Hunter, Danny Casio, George Astasio, Jason Pebworth, Jon Shave and Nicola Roberts, with production by Mike Spencer. An electropop song, the lyrics of "Let You" find Cheryl telling a former lover how she allowed them to make her unhappy.

The track was met with critical acclaim upon its release, with critics favouring its catchiness and 1980s influences. Reviewers also noted similarities to her previous singles, as well of those of Girls Aloud. The song debuted and peaked at number 57 on the UK Singles Chart, making it Cheryl's thirteenth UK top 75 single. The accompanying music video for "Let You" was filmed in Downtown Los Angeles, and features the singer dancing on rooftops and walking through the city, after pushing away a lover.

== Writing and production ==
"Let You" was written by Cheryl, Chiara Hunter, Danny Casio, George Astasio, Jason Pebworth, Jon Shave and Nicola Roberts. The song came to fruition after the singer held conversations with her friends, about "men and relationship patterns". In an interview with Stella magazine, Cheryl stated that "Let You" is about "men who were controlling, who made me unhappy" and how "women let these relationships happen". Produced by Mike Spencer, the song sees Cheryl sing lyrics such as: "I let you lead me down the wrong track, now I've gotta own that" and "I gave you loyalty, you were on your knees". It features "juddering 80s-style beats" and a double chorus.

== Release and promotion ==
In April 2018, a snippet of "Let You" was posted by co-writer Roberts on her Instagram story. The song was announced by Cheryl a year later, and teasers of the song and its music video were posted on her social media accounts.

== Critical reception ==
Rob Copsey from the Official Charts Company commented that the song could "pass for a Girls Aloud" track, noting its "80-style beats" and "slightly wonky" structure. He concluded that the lyrics about "finding inner strength after a failed relationship" ensure that the song "is still very much a Cheryl affair". Similarly, "Let You" was described as an "80s throwback electropop banger" by Pip Ellwood-Hughes from Entertainment Focus. Lauren Murphy from Entertainment.ie called the song a "throbbing, zippy little dancefloor filler", who compared it to the work of Robyn.

== Chart performance ==
In June 2019, "Let You" debuted at number 57 on the UK Singles Chart, becoming Cheryl's thirteenth top 75 entry on the chart. The song debuted at number 12 on the Scottish Singles Chart and 73 on the Irish Singles Chart.

== Music video ==
The accompanying music video for "Let You" was filmed in downtown Los Angeles. It premiered on the day of the song's release on Cheryl's official YouTube channel and depicts the singer dancing on a rooftop with a troupe of dancers and interacting with a partner.

== Track listing ==
- Digital download / streaming - Single
1. "Let You" – 2:46
- Digital download / streaming - Cahill Remix
1. "Let You" (Cahill edit) – 3:33
- Digital download / streaming - Might Mouse Remix
1. "Let You" (Mighty Mouse edit) – 3:18
- Digital download / streaming - Orchestral Version
1. "Let You" (Orchestral version) – 3:02

== Credits and personnel ==
Credits adapted from Tidal.

- Cheryl Tweedy – vocals, composition, lyrics
- Chiara Hunter – composition, lyrics
- Danny Casio – composition, lyrics
- George Astasio – composition, lyrics
- Jason Pebworth – composition, lyrics
- Jon Shave – composition, lyrics
- Nicola Roberts – composition, lyrics
- Anna Straker – keyboard
- Martin Hollis – engineering
- Joe LaPorta – mastering
- Mike Spencer – production, bass guitar, mixing, programming

== Charts ==
Chart (2019)	Peak position
Ireland (IRMA)	73
Scotland (OCC)	12
UK Singles (OCC)	57

== Release history ==
Region	Date	Format	Label	Ref.
Various	31 May 2019	Digital download; streaming	3 Beat	
