= The Flood (Cheryl Cole song) =

Single by Cheryl Cole

from the album Messy Little Raindrops
- Released: 2 January 2011
- Recorded: 2010
- Genre: Pop
- Length: 3:57
- Label: Fascination; Polydor
- Songwriters: Priscilla Hamilton; Wayne Wilkins
- Producers: Wilkins; Antwoine "T-Wiz" Collins

Cheryl Cole singles chronology
"Promise This" (2010)	"The Flood" (2011)	"Call My Name" (2012)

"The Flood" is a song by English singer Cheryl Cole. The song was written by Priscilla Hamilton and Wayne Wilkins, for Cole's second studio album, Messy Little Raindrops (2010). It was released on 2 January 2011 through Fascination Records (Polydor Records), as the album's second and final single. The song, produced by Wilkins and Antwoine Collins, has lyrics that refer to a "natural disaster love" and make many allusions to shipwreck, the sea, and water.

"The Flood" received mixed reviews from music critics. Despite some saying the song is perfectly suited to Cole's voice, critics questioned Cole's effectiveness as a balladeer, while calling the song "a flood of stool". "The Flood" achieved moderate success, peaking at number eighteen in the United Kingdom, making it Cole's first solo single to not enter the top 5 on the chart. The song also peaked at number twenty-six in Ireland and at number forty-six in Europe.

An accompanying music video for the song, directed by Sophie Muller, was released on 24 November 2010. Filmed on the southern coast of England, it portrays Cole alone in a remote house overlooking a stormy ocean, while she struggles to adjust to life without her love. "The Flood" was performed at 2010's Royal Variety Performance in front of Charles, Prince of Wales and his wife Camilla, Duchess of Cornwall. It was also performed in an acoustic form, along with "Promise This", on Alan Carr: Chatty Man.

== Composition ==
"The Flood"
A sample of the song's chorus features Cole comparing love to water's flow.

"The Flood" was written by Priscilla Hamilton and Wayne Wilkins, who also produced the song, along with Antwoine "T-Wiz" Collins. It is a pop song with synthesised strings. The song composed in the key of C major and is set in time signature of common time with a tempo of 80 beats per minute. The song has a basic sequence of C–C–G/D–Am–C/E as its chord progression. Cole's vocals range from G4-D6. The lyrical content of the song was described as "a massive, strong-laden, Christmassy tear-jerker about 'wreckage', 'drowning' and 'natural disaster love.'" "The Flood" received comparisons to songs by singer-songwriter Natalie Imbruglia.

== Critical reception ==
The song received a positive review from Digital Spy reviewer Nick Levine who gave the song four out of five stars. He wrote, "Cole's no Leona of course, but she more than holds her own vocally as she delivers an extended and just-slightly-strained love-as-h2o metaphor." Critics questioned Cole's effectiveness as a balladeer. The Guardian's Maddy Costa criticized the song's "lacklustre quality exacerbated by Cole's weakness as a balladeer and her (understandable) difficulty injecting feeling into a love song." Tom Hocknell of BBC Music wrote, Cole "loses focus with The Flood, stretching a shipwreck analogy over an uncomfortable four minutes." Luke Turner of NME gave the song a negative review comparing it to "a flood of stool."

== Chart performance ==
On the week of 13 November 2010, "The Flood" debuted at number eighty-one in the United Kingdom. The song peaked at number eighteen six weeks later, making it the first solo single by Cole not to reach the top five in the UK. It also became only the second single in her entire career to miss the Top 10 in the United Kingdom, the first being "Untouchable" two years before with Girls Aloud. "The Flood" was Cole's lowest-charting single, until it was surpassed by "Only Human", which peaked at number 70 in 2014. The song also peaked at number twenty-six in Ireland.

== Music video ==
Cole staring at the ocean from a remote house, trying to adjust to life without her love.

Before the release of the album, a preview of "The Flood" was first premiered through Cole's official website. Later, the music video for the song, directed by Sophie Muller, premiered on 24 November 2010, three weeks after the album's release. It was filmed against a backdrop of white cliffs on England's south coast.

== Live performances ==
"The Flood" was performed at the 82nd annual Royal Variety Performance, held at the London Palladium theatre with Charles, Prince of Wales and Camilla, Duchess of Cornwall in attendance. She wore a gown from Roberto Cavalli's spring 2011 collection with jewelry by David Morris. Cole also performed on the 20 December 2010 episode of Alan Carr: Chatty Man, singing "The Flood" and an acoustic version of "Promise This".

== Track listing ==
- CD single
1. "The Flood" — 3:57
2. "The Flood" (The Wideboys Radio Edit) — 3:01
- Digital download
1. "The Flood" — 3:57
2. "The Flood" (The Wideboys Radio Edit) — 3:01
3. "The Flood" (The Alias Radio Edit) — 3:14
4. "The Flood" (Loco Remix) — 3:31

== Credits and personnel ==
- Songwriting – Priscilla Hamilton, Wayne Wilkins
- Production and programming – Wayne Wilkins, Antwoine "T-Wiz" Collins
- Backing vocals – Priscilla Renea, RaVaughn Brown
- Drums – Antwoine "T-Wiz" Collins
- Engineering – Anthony Kronfle, Juliette Amoroso
- Guitar – Nick Lashley
- Keyboards – Wayne Wilkins
- Mixing – Mark Stent, Matty Green (assistant)
- Mastering – Brian Gardner

== Charts ==
Chart (2010–2011)	Peak position
Ireland (IRMA)	26
Scotland Singles (OCC)	14
UK Singles (OCC)	18

== Release history ==
Region	Date	Format	Label
Ireland	2 January 2011	Digital download	Fascination Records
United Kingdom	2 January 2011	Digital download	Fascination Records
United Kingdom	3 January 2011	CD single	Fascination Records
