= Crazy Stupid Love (song) =

Single by Cheryl Cole featuring Tinie Tempah

from the album Only Human
- Released: 30 June 2014
- Recorded: 2014
- Studio: London (Metropolis Studios, Sarm Studios); West Hollywood (NightBird Studios)
- Genre: Pop; R&B
- Length: 3:46
- Label: Polydor
- Songwriters: Cheryl Cole; Wayne Wilkins; Heidi Rojas; Katelyn Tarver; Patrick Okogwu
- Producers: Wayne Wilkins; Kevin Anyaeji

Cheryl Cole singles chronology
"Under the Sun" (2012)	"Crazy Stupid Love" (2014)	"I Don't Care" (2014)

Tinie Tempah singles chronology
"Tsunami (Jump)" (2014)	"Crazy Stupid Love" (2014)	"Tears Run Dry" (2014)

"Crazy Stupid Love" is a song recorded by British singer Cheryl Cole for her fourth studio album Only Human (2014), featuring British hip hop artist Tinie Tempah. The song was co-written by Cole, Tempah, Wayne Wilkins, Heidi Rojas, Katelyn Tarver and Kevin Anyaeji, and produced by Wilkins. It was released on 30 June 2014 as the lead single from the album, coinciding with Cole's 31st birthday. Musically, the song is a pop and R&B song with saxophones, handclaps, percussion and fingersnaps, while lyrically talks about being uncontrollably in love with someone.

"Crazy Stupid Love" received generally favourable reviews from music critics, whom praised its instrumentation, the song's catchiness and Tempah's appearance. The song debuted atop of the UK Singles Chart, becoming Cole's fourth number one single there and Tempah's fifth, with the former becoming the third British female in history to achieve a quartet of chart-toppers in the UK. The song also topped the charts in the Republic of Ireland.

To promote the song, an accompanying music video was released on 9 June 2014, which sees Cole performing the track in an underground club, while Tinie Tempah also makes a cameo. She also performed the song on several live performances, including Britain's Got Talent and Capital FM's Summertime Ball, as well as being a guest on The Graham Norton Show.

== Background ==
Following the release of Cole's third studio album, A Million Lights, in June 2012 and embarking on her debut solo headlining tour, Cole confirmed that a Girls Aloud's reunion would occur in November 2012. The group released their second greatest hits compilation, Ten on 26 November 2012 and embarked on Ten: The Hits Tour in February and March 2013. In March 2013, following the completion of the tour, Girls Aloud released a statement via their official Twitter confirming that they were splitting permanently.

The song was originally recorded by Australian recording artist Kylie Minogue for her twelfth studio album Kiss Me Once (2014). She worked with Wilkins on the track and wanted it to be used on the album, but management Roc Nation did not like it because it was "too pop." Wilkins later gave the track to Cole to record, who later contributed additional writing to the song. On 27 May 2014, in an interview with Hello!, Cole announced that her fourth studio album would be released in November, preceded by lead single "Crazy Stupid Love", featuring Tinie Tempah. On 29 May, it was confirmed that Cole would debut the single on 2 June on BBC Radio 1, Capital FM and Kiss, with the video premiering on 9 June. The single's cover art features Cole wearing "a gold bodysuit whilst her hair galavanted around her face", as noted by Metro's Hanna Gale.

== Composition ==
"Crazy Stupid Love" was written and produced by Wayne Wilkins, who also co-produced and co-wrote Cole's debut single "Fight for This Love", alongside Cole, Heidi Rojas, Katelyn Tarver, Kevin Anyaeji and British rapper Tinie Tempah, who contributed a rap. The pop and dancey R&B song is built on a toe-tapping structure with plenty of saxophones and a "la la la la la" refrain. Lyrically, the song has Cole gushing about her uncontrollable feelings for her boyfriend, with lyrics like, "You make my brain stop/ Sink my heart to my feet."

== Critical reception ==
"Crazy Stupid Love" has received generally positive reviews from music critics and fans alike. Lewis Corner of Digital Spy awarded the song 3.5 stars out of 5, and commented: "Sure, the lyrics are laden with sweet nothings and clichéd sentiments, but while Mrs Fernandez-Versini [Cheryl] may be swirling in mushy marital bliss right now, she hasn't sacrificed any of that star-quality sassiness to pull it off." Maggie Pannacione of Artist Direct was very complimentary with the song, calling it "crazy catchy, with its pop neo-sax, handclaps, percussion and fingersnaps."

Brendon Veevers of Renowned for Sound claimed that the song "has a JLo/Beyoncé-ish vibe running through it in terms of its quick delivered, toe-tapping structure while Brit rapper Tinchy Stryder adds an effortless rap licking to the number nearing its end as horns toot left, right and centre allowing for the song to dip its toes in almost Latino-pop territory." Hannah Mylrea of The Edge gave a mixed opinion about Cole's vocals, calling it "lacklustre", while also dismissing Tempah's appearance, calling it "dull" and "unnecessary", and labeled the song itself as "a repetitive, fairly average pop track." Maximum Pop! described the song as "bang on trend" thanks to its saxophone break, but suggested it may suffer from coming so soon after Ariana Grande's hit single Problem.

== Chart performance ==
It was announced that "Crazy Stupid Love" had sold 77,000 downloads according to the midweek Official Charts Company. On 27 July 2014, the single entered at number one on the UK Singles Chart selling 118,000 copies, becoming Cole's fourth number one single on the chart, tying her with Geri Halliwell and Rita Ora as the third British female to achieve four solo number ones and also making it the fastest selling single during the summer holiday period and the fastest selling single of the third quarter of the year, it also became Tinie Tempah's fifth UK number one. In the Republic of Ireland, the single also entered at number one on the Irish Singles Chart on 25 July 2014. "Crazy Stupid Love" debuted at number 39 in Spain, becoming her most successful song in that region since "Fight for This Love" in 2010.

== Music video ==
The music video for the song was shot in May 2014 at The Underground Club in London and directed by Colin Tilley. It premiered on 9 June 2014.

== Live performances ==
Cole and Tempah performed "Crazy Stupid Love" for the first time on the final of the eighth series of Britain's Got Talent on 7 June 2014. Cole appeared on The Graham Norton Show on 20 June and performed the song as part of her set at Capital FM's Summertime Ball the following day, 21 June 2014.

== Track listing ==
- Digital download
1. "Crazy Stupid Love" (featuring Tinie Tempah) – 3:46
- The Remixes EP
1. "Crazy Stupid Love" (featuring Tinie Tempah) (Club Mix) – 3:29
2. "Crazy Stupid Love" (featuring Tinie Tempah) (LuvBug Remix) – 4:06
3. "Crazy Stupid Love" (Steve Smart and West Funk Club Mix) – 4:36
4. "Crazy Stupid Love" (Patrick Hagenaar Colour Code Remix) – 7:02

== Credits and personnel ==
Credits are taken from the Only Human liner notes.

Locations

- Recorded at Metropolis Studios and Sarm Studios in London, United Kingdom and NightBird Recording Studios in West Hollywood, California, United States.

Personnel

- Cheryl Cole — vocals
- Wayne Wilkins — production, mixing, synths, keys, programming
- Tinie Tempah — vocals
- Kevin Anyaeji — additional production, engineering, programming
- Lewey Melchor — engineering

== Charts ==
=== Weekly charts ===
Chart (2014)	Peak position
Australia (ARIA)	43
Belgium (Ultratip Bubbling Under Flanders)	47
Belgium Urban (Ultratop Flanders)	38
Belgium (Ultratip Bubbling Under Wallonia)	12
Euro Digital Song Sales (Billboard)	1
France (SNEP)	172
Ireland (IRMA)	1
Scotland Singles (OCC)	1
Spain (Promusicae)	39
UK Singles (OCC)	1

=== Year-end charts ===
Chart (2014)	Position
UK Singles (Official Charts Company)	46

== Certifications ==
Region	Certification	Certified units/sales
United Kingdom (BPI)	Platinum	600,000^{‡}
^{‡} Sales+streaming figures based on certification alone.

== See also ==
- List of number-one singles of 2014 (Ireland)
- List of number-one hits of 2014 (Scotland)
- List of UK Singles Chart number ones of the 2010s

== Release history ==
Region	Date	Format	Label	Ref.
United Kingdom	30 June 2014	Contemporary hit radio	Polydor	
Ireland	18 July 2014	Digital download	Polydor	
Germany	18 July 2014	Digital download	Polydor	
Netherlands	18 July 2014	Digital download	Polydor	
Australia	18 July 2014	Digital download	Polydor	
Finland	18 July 2014	Digital download	Polydor	
United Kingdom	20 July 2014	Digital download	Polydor	
France	21 July 2014	Digital download	Polydor	
Denmark	21 July 2014	Digital download	Polydor	
Japan	21 July 2014	Digital download	Polydor	
Taiwan	21 July 2014	Digital download	Polydor	
Belgium	21 July 2014	Digital download	Polydor	
Italy	21 July 2014	Digital download	Polydor	
Poland	21 July 2014	Digital download	Polydor	
Spain	21 July 2014	Digital download	Polydor	
