= A Million Lights – Live at the O2 =

A Million Lights - Live at the O2

Video by Cheryl
- Released: 26 November 2012
- Recorded: 7 October 2012; The O2 Arena (London)
- Length: 70 minutes
- Label: Polydor; ITV Studios
- Director: Paul Caslin
- Producer: Audrey Davenport

A Million Lights - Live at the O2 is the first live long-form video by English recording artist Cheryl.

== Track listing ==
No.	Title	Writer(s)	Length
1.	"Sexy Den a Mutha"	Jim Beanz; Megan Nicolle Thomaston
2.	"Call My Name"	Calvin Harris
3.	"Girl in the Mirror"	Aaron Cowan; Jareth Rwamafa-Johnson
4.	"Promise This"	Priscilla Hamilton; Wayne Wilkins; Christopher Jackson
5.	"Girls Aloud Medley"
6.	"Under the Sun"	Alex da Kid; Mike Del Rio; Jayson DeZuzio; Steven Battey; Carlos Battey; Cheryl Cole
7.	"The Flood"	Hamilton; Wilkins
8.	"Parachute"	Ingrid Michaelson; Marshall Altman
9.	"Last One Standing"	Billy Wes; Onique "Sparrow" Williams
10.	"3 Words"	William Adams; George Pajon; Cole
11.	"A Million Lights"	Greg Bonnick; Leon Price; Peter Renshaw; Tom Havelock
12.	"DJ Set"
13.	"Ghetto Baby"	Elizabeth Grant; Roy Kerr; Anu Pillai
14.	"Screw You"	Thomaston; Kingsley Brown; Daniel Traynor; Jermaine Scott
15.	"Fight for This Love"	Wilkins; Steve Kipner; Andre Merritt
16.	"Call My Name (Extended Mix)"	Harris

== Charts ==
Chart (2012)	Peak position
UK Video (Official Charts Company)	4
