= A Million Lights Tour =

2012 concert tour by Cheryl Cole

- Tour by Cheryl Cole
- Promotional poster for tour
- Associated album: A Million Lights
- Start date: 3 October 2012
- End date: 17 October 2012
- Legs: 1
- No. of shows: 11 in Europe

The A Millions Lights Tour was the debut concert tour by English singer Cheryl Cole. It promoted Cole's third studio album, A Million Lights. The tour marks Cole's first solo venture, touring extensively from 2005 to 2009 with pop group Girls Aloud. The show ran during October 2012, with 11 shows in the United Kingdom and Ireland.

== Background ==
With the release of her latest album only one week away, the tour was announced via Cole's website on 12 June 2012.

Rehearsal for the tour began late August 2012 at Studio 1342 in Los Angeles. The sessions were cut short as Cole and will.i.am were involved in car accident during the early morning. The singer returned to the UK in an arm sling to complete promotional radio spots, with rehearsals continuing in London. During the radio spots, the singer stated the tour would feature will.i.am. and Wretch 32 at one of the concerts. She also stated costumes were being designed by Renelou Padora. During the final weeks, Cole and crew rehearsed the production at the Olympic Basketball Arena, before heading to Belfast. While in Northern Ireland, dancing Tre Holloway fractured his leg, causing him to be absent from the first three shows of the jaunt.

== Critical reception ==
The tour received mixed reviews from critics and fans. For the debut concert in Belfast, Ashleigh Rainbird from Daily Mirror gave the show four out of five stars. She proclaims the concert was a "first night triumph".

At The O_{2} in Dublin, Ed Power of The Daily Telegraph gave the Irish gig three out of five stars. He states, "[T]hough her vocals were generally strong, Cheryl never imprinted her personality on the performance. At times the music felt like a calculating mash-up of chart trends—a little Rihanna here, a hint of Britney and Beyoncé there. How strange that, surrounded by state of the art production and dazzling costumery, one of the most recognisable women in pop should seem so faceless".

In London, André Paine writing for London Evening Standard gave the show three out of five stars, calling the show uneven yet ultimately enjoyable. He continues, "It was all over in 70 minutes and while Cheryl did just enough to justify her solo career, you suspect she's looking forward to being part of a girl group again". At the same concert, Robert Copsey from Digital Spy gave Cole's performance three out of five stars, saying the singer's performance was surprising flat. He says, "The flashes of brilliance in 'Under The Sun', '3 Words'—which featured a surprise appearance by friend and mentor will.i.am—and 'Fight for This Love' proved that she is capable of holding her own in front of a larger crowd. Though with a new book out and a number of well-publicised TV and film spots on the horizon, it proved all-too-easy to remember that she's a celebrity as much as a poster".

During the final shows at the Metro Radio Arena in Newcastle, Jessica Philips of Sunderland Echo called the homecoming concert triumphant but short. She also stated, "Her fellow Geordies were practically effervescent in their enthusiasm for their idol, chanting her name with all their might".

== Broadcasts and recordings ==
Shortly after the tour was completed, a DVD release was issued for November 2012. In November, Cole had two specials airing on ITV2. The first was a behind-the-scenes documentary titled, "Cheryl: All Access Areas". The special showed footage from the London concert, along with rehearsals and intimate moments with Cole. The special aired 20 November 2012, to an audience of over 800,000 viewers. The second was an abbreviated concert special, filmed at The O_{2} Arena in London. The special, "Cheryl: Live in Concert—A Million Lights Tour", aired 25 November 2012. The DVD titled A Million Lights: Live at The O_{2}, was released on 26 November 2012.

== Set list ==
This set list is representative of the 3 October 2012 show in Belfast. It does not represent all dates of the tour.

Act One

1. "Sexy Den a Mutha"
2. "Call My Name"
3. "Girl in the Mirror"
4. "Promise This"

Act Two

5. Girls Aloud Medley: "The Promise" / "Biology" / "Love Machine"
6. "Under The Sun"
7. "The Flood"

Act Three

8. "Parachute"
9. "Last One Standing"
10. "3 Words"
11. "A Million Lights"

Act Four

12. "DJ Section" (contains excerpts from "Let"s Get Down", "Heartbreaker", "Cockiness (Love It)", "Sexy and I Know It", "Gangnam Style", "Boys Lie", "Love Killer" and "Wanna Be Startin' Somethin'") (Dance Interlude)
13. "Ghetto Baby"
14. "Screw You"

Encore

15. "Fight for This Love"
16. "Call My Name" (Reprise) (contains elements of the Wideboys Remix)

Notes

- During the concert in London, Cole was joined onstage by will.i.am. during the performance of "3 Words". Later in the concert, Cole was joined by Wretch 32 for "Screw You".

== Tour dates ==
List of concerts, showing date, city, country and venue and opening acts
Date	City	Country	Venue	Opening act	Attendance	Revenue
Europe
3 October 2012	Belfast	Northern Ireland	Odyssey Arena	The Original Rudeboys	–	–
4 October 2012	Dublin	Ireland	3Arena	The Original Rudeboys	–	–
6 October 2012	Nottingham	England	Capital FM Arena	Tinchy Stryder	–	–
7 October 2012	London	England	The O_{2} Arena	Tinchy Stryder	10,471 / 13,438	$653,447
9 October 2012	Sheffield	England	Motorpoint Arena	Tinchy Stryder	–	–
11 October 2012	Liverpool	England	Echo Arena	Tinchy Stryder	–	–
12 October 2012	Birmingham	England	LG Arena	Tinchy Stryder	–	–
13 October 2012	Manchester	England	Manchester Arena	Tinchy Stryder	9,288 / 10,084	$521,948
15 October 2012	Glasgow	Scotland	SECC Concert Hall 4	Vince Kidd	–	–
16 October 2012	Newcastle	England	Metro Radio Arena	Tinchy Stryder	–	–
17 October 2012	Newcastle	England	Metro Radio Arena	Tinchy Stryder	–	–
Total					–	–

== Personnel ==
Band

- Backing vocals: Alexis Strader, Renard Hughes
- Dancers:
- Walter Holloway III (Tre)
- Tyrell Washington
- Felix Burgos
- Marshall Lake
- Brandee Stephens-Harris
- Ambrya Underwood
- Alex Larson
- Aviel Ayoung
- Vinceny Clemmons
- Adrian Wiltshire

Management

- Creative Director: Fatima Robinson
- Set Design: Bruce Rodgers
- Musical Director: Keith Harris
- Choreography: Misha Gabriel, Beth Honan, Charm Ladonna, Adrian Wiltshire
- Tour Production: Production North
- Production Manager: Iain Whitehead
- Stage Manager: Milan Rakic
- Management for Rocket Pop Management LLp: Seth Friedman, Polo Molina, Lily Endland, Garry Tweedy
- Agent For William Morris Agency: Solomon Parker

Crew

- Styling: Renelou Padora
- Glam: Lisa Laudat
- Rigging Company: Over The Top
- Rigger: Mark Wade
- Set Carpenters: Chris Bridges, Graham Kearsley, Stephen Buckley
- Lighting Company: HSL
- Lighting Designer: Peter Burnes
- Lighting Operator: Neil Trenell
- Lighting Crew Boss: Johnny Harper
- Lighting Technician: John Trincas, Chris Roper
- PA Company: Wigwam Acoustics
- FOH: Nick Warren
- Monitor Engineer: James Baker
- PA Technician: Rob Priddle, Jack "Ginger Joe" Murphy
- Pyro Technician: Steve Britton
- Video Company: VER, XL Video
- Tour Video Director: Ruary Macphie
- Video Engineer: Rod Martin
- LED Technician: David "Chalky" White
- LED Tech/Cameraman: Al Bolland
- Projectionist/Cameraman: Danny Sheldon
- Screens Content: Helene Spencer for The Field
- Backline: James Wiffen
- Wardrobe: Hadassah Boyde, Marge Christodoulou, Michele Potter
- Catering Company: Snakatak
- Caterer: Stephen Knuden, Robert Oliver, Matt Holland, Lisa Cribley
- Promoter Rep: Maximus Burnham (UK), Turlough McShane (Belfast), Aiden Lee (Dublin)
- Trucking Company: Stardes
- Lead Truck Driver: Dave "Rambo" Ramsden
- Truck Driver: Simon Sinclair, Neil Moran, Gary Bunfield, Robert Quinn, Roy Ladds, Michael Staniforth
- Band Bus Company: Jumbocruiser
- Band Bus Driver: Billy Higgs
- Crew Bus Company: Four Season Travel
- Crew Bus Driver: Malcom Farrey, Alan Watkins
- Day Bus Company: Glen Marshalls for Marshalls
- Travel Agent: Abgail Dillon for The Tour Division
- Accountant: James Doran for Livewire
- Tour Book Keeping: June Jones for CIA
- Merchandising: Global Merchandising Services
- Merchandising Rep: Keith "Pledge" Pledger
- Legal: Nicola Harvey, Mauny Wright, David Oudot
- Production Accountant: Kristen Hemmingway
- Runners: Farah Riaz, Kyle Jamrozy, Mehren Ahmed
- Production Coordinator: Christopher Woodhams
- Audio Recording: Peter Theobald for Wigwam Audio
- Audio Mixing: John Norten
- Audio Mastering: Jonathan Last
- Additional Lighting: PRG
- Gaffer: Rich Gorrod
- Lighting Crew: Lars Kirstiansen, Phil Sharp, Pete MacDonald, Simon Anderson
- Arenamation: Helene Spencer for The Field
- OB Company: Trick Box
- Technical Manager: Liam Laminman
- Key Engineer: Carl Own
- Engineer: Paul Nancollis, Steve Grant
- Engineer/Rigger: Clive Owen
- Riggers: James Woods, Mark Davis, Nick Wilkes
- Camera Assistants: Chris Hayden, Andrew Trewartha, Ollie Wesley
- Focus Pullers: Sam Garwood, Oleg Poupko, Warren Buckingham, Jon Mitchell, Roger Bowles
- Jib Assistant: Giles Mallard
- Crane Technicians: Martin Elven, Jon Crawford
- Grips: Jem Morton, Pete Muncey, Ken Ashley Johnson
- Crane Operator: Dave Emery, Tony Freeman
- Camera Operator: Rob Kar, Sam Keogh, John Simmons, Adam Rogers, Greg O'Callaghan, Dax De Bice
- Music PA: Emily Aldous
