= Ghetto Baby =

Song by Cheryl

from the album A Million Lights
- Recorded: February 2012
- Genre: Hip hop, indie pop, R&B
- Length: 2:49
- Label: Fascination
- Songwriters: Elizabeth Grant; Roy Kerr; Anu Pillai
- Producers: Kid Gloves; Jim Beanz (vocals)

"Ghetto Baby" is a song by English singer and songwriter Cheryl for her third studio album A Million Lights (2012). The hip hop-inspired song was written by American singer and songwriter Lana Del Rey, Roy Kerr and Anu Pillai, with production helmed by the latter two under the name Kid Gloves. Music critics were divided in their response to "Ghetto Baby", stating that the track is a highlight on the album, despite Cole sounding too much like Del Rey. An accompanying music video was directed by Rankin, and features Cole and her then boyfriend and back-up dancer Tre Holloway indulging in a public display of affection while performing the track. "Ghetto Baby" was performed on Cole's debut headlining solo concert tour, named A Million Lights Tour, in October 2012.

== Background and composition ==
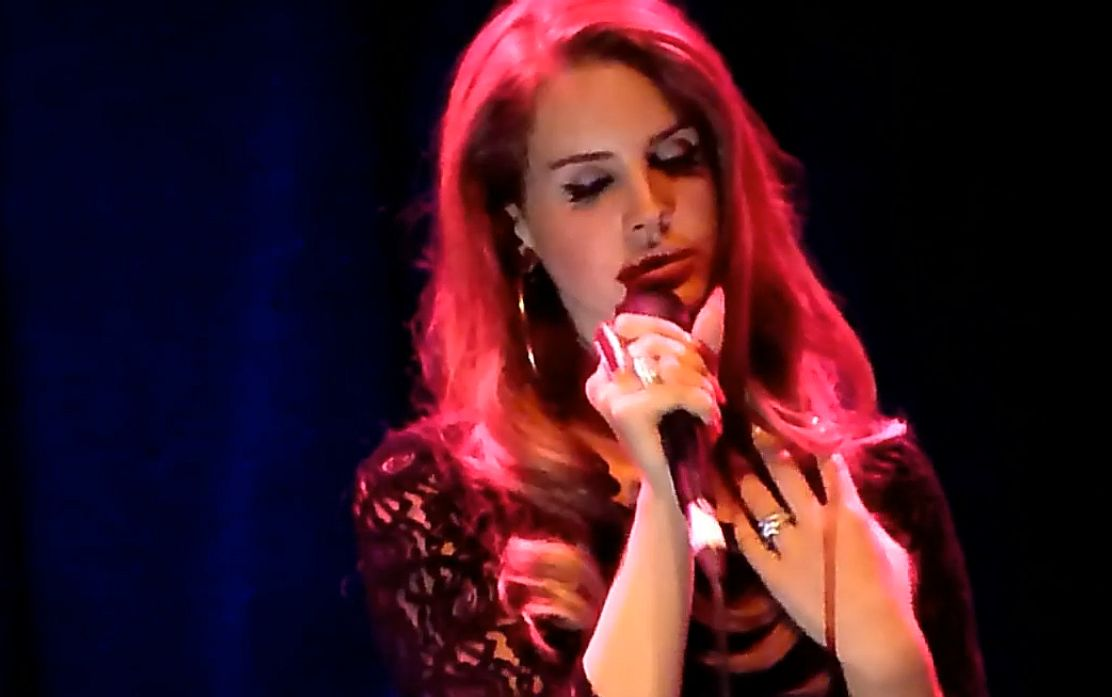
Lana Del Rey wrote the song "Ghetto Baby" for the album.

Cole began working on her third studio album in July 2011 at the Sunset Marquis Hotel in Los Angeles, California. In May 2012, the singer confirmed that American recording artist Lana Del Rey had collaborated on a track for A Million Lights. In an interview with Capital FM, Cole stated that she had noticed Del Rey "about a year ago. I was hearing these songs that were really fresh to my ear and amazing and I asked the guy who she was and he said, 'Watch out for her, it's a girl called Lana Del Rey'." The singer explained that she was played another one of Del Rey's tracks and loved it so much, that it eventually led to a collaboration. "It all happened really organically just like that. And then 'Video Games' came out and I fell in love with her as an artist as well, so yeah, she's super talented." Del Rey had penned the song, which was cut from her second studio album, Born to Die. On 28 May 2012, Cole tweeted a few lyrics of the song: "I'm not a trick boy I'm a trick for you, you give me butterflies heart skipping 1, 2, I know your sick boy I wanna get the flu (sic)... I'm running temperatures thinking of your love boo..", adding the hashtag "#ghettobaby." "Ghetto Baby", produced by Kid Gloves, is a hip hop track. Written by Elizabeth Grant, Roy Kerr and Anu Pillai, the song's lyrics were considered by Laurence Green of musicOMH "classic Lana Del Rey"; a beat-heavy number "woven from kisses, stilettos and sultry speak-singing," with lines such as "When he's bad he's bad / But when he's good no one's better / Cos we're a match made in heaven / And this kind of love's forever." A MTV news writer said that the track is "riddled with elements of the New York singer, with Cheryl even displaying Lana-esque vocals." "Ghetto Baby" was released on 15 June 2012, while Del Rey's demo leaked online on 9 August 2012.

== Critical reception ==
Stephen Thomas Erlewine of Allmusic deemed it as one of the album's highlights, but stated that, on many tracks from A Million Lights such as "Ghetto Baby" and "Under the Sun", "Cheryl doesn't stamp these sounds with her own personality; she merely tries the personas on for size, not so much to see if they fit, but rather to see which ones will allow her entry into the charts." A Virgin Media reviewer said that, on the song, Cole "sounds exactly what she is – a plucky disco diva," while an Idolator contributor stated that the track was not right for the singer, because it "sounds so much like a Lana Del Rey cut that we just can't help but feel that Lana herself should be singing it. ... Cheryl's voice isn't 'ghetto' (or babyish) enough to pull off these lyrics — and love her or hate her, Lana's voice is distinctive enough to at least make you take notice. Not to mention the most ghetto thing about this song is the dated 'Drop It Like It's Hot' reference." Elena Gorgan of Softpedia considered "Ghetto Baby" a solid song, despite being "less dance-inspired" than the other tracks on the album, "which could mean it never sees the light of day as a single." When reviewing A Million Lights, Alexis Petridis said the song "is actually the handiwork of Lana Del Rey, who, in a volte-face designed to confound critics who've noted that all her songs are about exactly the same thing – doomed love for a beautiful bad boy on the run – has alighted on the radical new topic of her doomed love for a beautiful bad boy on the run."

== Music video ==
An accompanying music video was uploaded to Cole's VEVO on 25 December 2012 and was directed by Rankin, who thanked Cole for "such an ace collaboration. It's always fun." Prior to the release on Christmas, the singer tweeted all day on 24 December 2012 the hashtag "#CCandRankinMidnight." On 25 December 2012, at midnight GMT, she revealed the music video for "Ghetto Baby", adding that she loved working with the director so much "that I did this exclusively for him."

== Personnel ==
- Cheryl – lead vocals, background vocals
- Lana Del Rey – songwriter
- Roy Kerr – songwriter
- Anu Pillai – songwriter
- Kid Gloves – producer, vocal producer
- Mike Marsh – mastering
- Naweed – mastering

Credits adapted from the album's liner notes.
