= Screw You =

Song by Cheryl featuring Wretch 32

from the album A Million Lights
- Recorded: 2011
- Genre: Electropop; R&B
- Length: 3:37
- Label: Polydor
- Songwriters: Megan Nicolle Thomaston; Kingsley Brown; Daniel Traynor; Jermaine Scott
- Producers: HyGrade; Jim Beanz (vocals)

"Screw You" is a song recorded by English recording artist Cheryl and British hip hop artist Wretch 32 for the former's third studio album A Million Lights (2012). "Screw You" was produced by Hy-Grade and written by Megan Nicolle Thomaston, Kingsley Brown, Daniel Traynor and Wretch 32 (Jermaine Scott).

== Background and composition ==
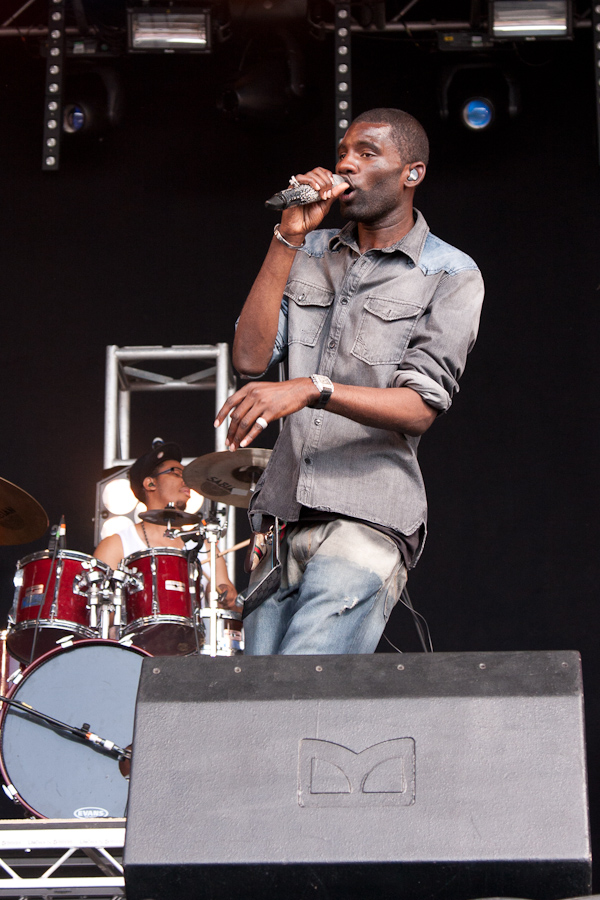
Wretch 32 made a guest appearance on "Screw You".

In May 2012, it was reported that British rapper Wretch 32 was approached to feature on the song 'Screw You' because Cole was a fan of his album Black and White. In an interview, Wretch revealed that he had worked with Cole on her album saying 'We've recorded a record that's very edgy, it's very cool. She smashes it and hopefully I've smashed it too, but I can't say that as that would be big-headed of me. 'But yeah. It's a very nice record and I've heard some other bits from her album and it's sounding good. I'm looking forward to getting response from the fans." Cole revealed that she was intoxicated while recording "Screw You", saying "I went in to record it hung over. I never do that. I’m not a big drinker but I was still drunk when I woke up" and revealed that she believed the inspiration for the song came for a picture of Cole giving the middle finger. "Screw You" is an urban song, produced by Hy-Grade and written by Megan Nicolle Thomaston, Kingsley Brown, Daniel Traynor and Jermaine Scott. It includes the lyrics "It never was enough, I never got your love, I loved you so much, but you never gave a fuck."

== Commercial performance ==
Cole announced that "Screw You" would serve as the third single from A Million Lights, following "Call My Name" and "Under the Sun". However, the single release of the track was cancelled to allow Cole to reunite with her Girls Aloud bandmates to celebrate their tenth anniversary and release the compilation album, Ten.

Upon the initial release of its parent album, the song debuted on the UK singles chart at number 100.

== Critical reception ==
Many Critics believed the lyrics of "Screw You" was aimed at Cole's ex-husband Ashley Cole, one critic saying "Maybe Ashley Cole thought he'd got away with cheating on Cheryl Cole but it seems the singer has now made the biggest dig at her ex by writing a song about him in the form of her new single 'Screw You'." However, Cole denied that the "Screw You" was written about Ashley Cole saying "I didn’t have him in mind. But I can see how it is interpreted that way, of course" Other critics believed that the song was written about Simon Cowell saying, "Press Association have reported that when the track listing was released back in March, this is the one track that naturally led many to assume that 'Screw You' was aimed at the singer's former X Factor boss Simon Cowell. Ouch! Back in March, the Girls Aloud star was still fresh from being axed from the U.S version of the X Factor, so the majority have put 2 + 2 together"

== Music video and live performances ==
"Screw You" was performed live for the first time during Cole's T4 special. It was broadcast on Channel 4 on 16 June 2012. "Under the Sun"", "Call My Name" and "Fight For This Love" were also performed. "Screw You" was also performed on the A Million Lights Tour.

Using Instagram, fans have the opportunity to create a visual inspired by any one word in the song. The best visuals will be used to help create a lyrics video for the song. On 27 September 2012, Cole uploaded the lyric video to her official VEVO account, the video consisted of text messages, drawings and photographs from her fans.

== Charts ==
Chart (2012)	Peak position
UK Singles (Official Charts Company)	100
