= A Million Lights =

Studio album by Cheryl
- Released: 15 June 2012
- Recorded: July 2011 – May 2012
- Genres: Pop; dance; R&B
- Length: 37:30
- Label: Fascination
- Producers: Alex da Kid; Calvin Harris; will.i.am; Jaylien Wesley; Pantha; HyGrade; Agent X; Dada Life; Kid Gloves; Jim Beanz; Taio Cruz; Mathias Wollo; The Beamer Boyz; Billy Wes; Electric; Bibi Jones; Dave Munday

Cheryl chronology
Messy Little Raindrops (2010)	A Million Lights (2012)	Only Human (2014)

Singles from A Million Lights
- 1. "Call My Name" Released: 18 May 2012; 2. "Under the Sun" Released: 2 September 2012

A Million Lights is the third studio album by English singer Cheryl, released on 15 June 2012 through Fascination Records. Following her divorce from Ashley Cole, this is Cheryl's first album to be released under the mononym Cheryl, dropping her married surname. The album was recorded in 2011 and 2012. As the executive producer of the album, Cheryl enlisted a variety of producers such as Alex da Kid, Calvin Harris, will.i.am, Pantha, Agent X, HyGrade, Dada Life, Jim Beanz, Taio Cruz, Mathias Wollo, The Beamer Boyz, Billy Wes, Electric, Bibi Jones and Dave Munday. Sonically, A Million Lights is a pop, dance and R&B album that draws influence from other genres such as dubstep, house and electronic music in its production.

Upon its release, A Million Lights received mainly mixed to positive reviews from music critics, who commended its progression from Cheryl's previous albums, but were ambivalent towards the mix of genres. The album debuted on the UK Albums Chart at position two, selling 34,934 copies in its first week. A Million Lights also peaked at two on the Irish Albums Chart, and one on the Scottish albums chart. A Million Lights was certified Gold in the United Kingdom for shipments of 100,000 copies.

Two singles were released from the album. The first single, "Call My Name", was released on 8 June 2012. With only three days of release, "Call My Name" sold a total of 97,000 in the United Kingdom alone, debuting at number one with first week sales of 152,001 and becoming the second fastest selling single of 2012. "Under the Sun" was released 2 September 2012 as the second single from the album. The song peaked at number 13, becoming her sixth solo top-twenty single. "Screw You" was scheduled to be the album's third single, but the release was cancelled indefinitely and no more singles were released from A Million Lights due to the reunion of Girls Aloud in November 2012.

== Background ==
Cheryl's second solo album, titled Messy Little Raindrops, was released on 1 November 2010. The album debuted at number one in the UK, and at number two in Ireland. On 19 August 2011 the album was certified Platinum by BPI, with sales in excess of 300,000.

On 5 May 2011, an announcement was made after months of speculation that Cheryl would be a judge alongside Simon Cowell, L.A. Reid, and Paula Abdul on the first season of the USA show of The X Factor following three consecutive years of having a judging seat on the UK show. However, after only three weeks as a judge and completing the auditions in Los Angeles and Chicago, Cheryl was dropped from the American judging panel and replaced by Nicole Scherzinger. Cowell said that the reason why Cheryl left was because he gave her the option to be a judge on the eighth series of the UK show as he felt that she would have been more comfortable there. Additionally, it was later confirmed that Cheryl would not be returning to the UK show either, as Tulisa already replaced her on the UK judging panel and Cheryl's unwillingness to judge the UK show without Cowell. Cheryl then began to focus on her third studio album and began recording sessions in July 2011.

== Recording ==
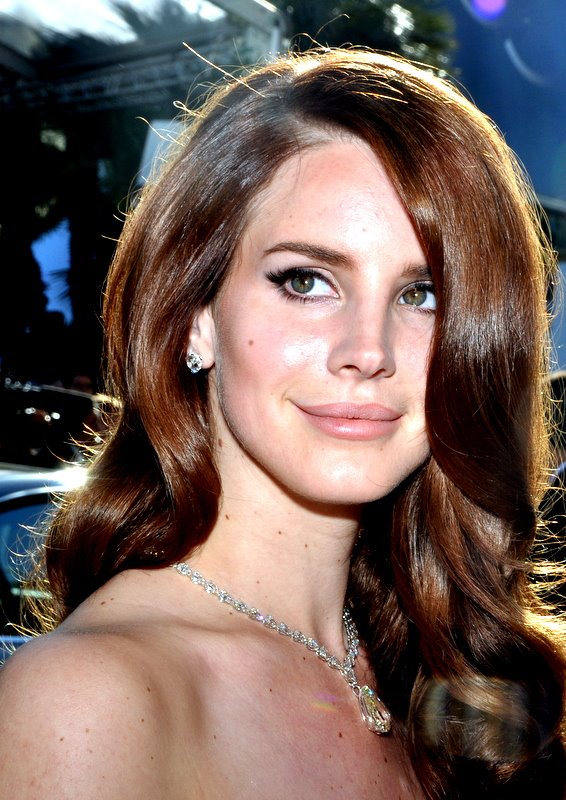
Lana Del Rey (pictured) wrote the song "Ghetto Baby" for the album.

Cheryl began working on her third studio album in July 2011. In an interview with web music magazine PopJustice, Cheryl recounted the recording process for the album. Recording for the album started after Cheryl received a call from will.i.am's partner Seth Friedman who said asked her to go to New York with him to work with the new producers, the Beemer Boys. Cheryl stated that she "made it clear [she] wanted to work with new producers with fresh ears and exciting newness." She then added that it was important for her to work with new producers: "It’s always amazing to have experience there but I like giving people a shot when I believe they’re talented. They have more fire in their belly. They’re more excited to make new sounds. They’re excited for a hit the possibility that their talent’s going to be heard. After all these years you need that." Cheryl recorded around 50 songs for the album, and while picking the final songs for the album she sometimes had to argue and fight for some songs she liked.

In July 2011, American hip hop group Far East Movement stated that they had been in the studio with both Cheryl and producer will.i.am. In early September 2011, musician Taio Cruz revealed that he had also been working on Cheryl's new album. In September 2011, Cheryl went to the studio with hip-hop producer Alex Da Kid. In May 2012, Cheryl confirmed that American singer Lana Del Rey wrote for A Million Lights. Cheryl spoke on how the pair worked together saying: "I noticed Lana about a year ago. I was hearing these songs that were really fresh to my ear and amazing and I asked the guy who she was and he said, 'Watch out for her, it's a girl called Lana Del Rey'." "It all happened really organically just like that. And then 'Video Games' came out and I fell in love with her as an artist as well." In May 2012, it was reported that British rapper Wretch 32 was approached to feature on the song 'Screw You' because Cheryl was a fan of his album Black and White. Cheryl revealed that she was intoxicated while recording "Screw You", saying "I went in to record it hung over. I never do that. I’m not a big drinker but I was still drunk when I woke up" and revealed that she believed the inspiration for the song came for a picture of Cheryl giving the middle finger. "Sexy Den a Mutha" was the last song that came to be recorded.

During an interview with Digital Spy, Cheryl commented on the album, "I think it's the best work I've done." She further stated, "You have to connect with something you're singing about. I'm not going to sing about a subject I've not got any feeling for. Every record I've made, there are songs I've written that I haven't put out because... well, I don't want to. I write for my own pleasure sometimes. I get sent a lot of tracks where there'll just be a beat, or a chorus. Sometimes I think, 'That chorus is amazing', and I'll write a verse to it, or someone else will write a verse to it." Cheryl spoke about knowing when the recording of the album was finished saying "Will and I had a three-hour meeting. It wasn’t supposed to be three hours – I was just supposed to play him some songs I liked. But I played him so many, and he was like, "you have more than enough here". When he said that I felt comfort in that."

== Music and lyrics ==
Like her previous albums 3 Words (2009) and Messy Little Raindrops (2010), A Million Lights draws from pop as well as dance and R&B sub-genres such as dubstep, house and electronic music. Cheryl spoke about the sound she wanted the album, using the first single "Call My Name" as an example of music that "makes you feel like you want to dance." Cheryl took influence from artists such as Beyoncé Knowles and Erykah Badu for the album.

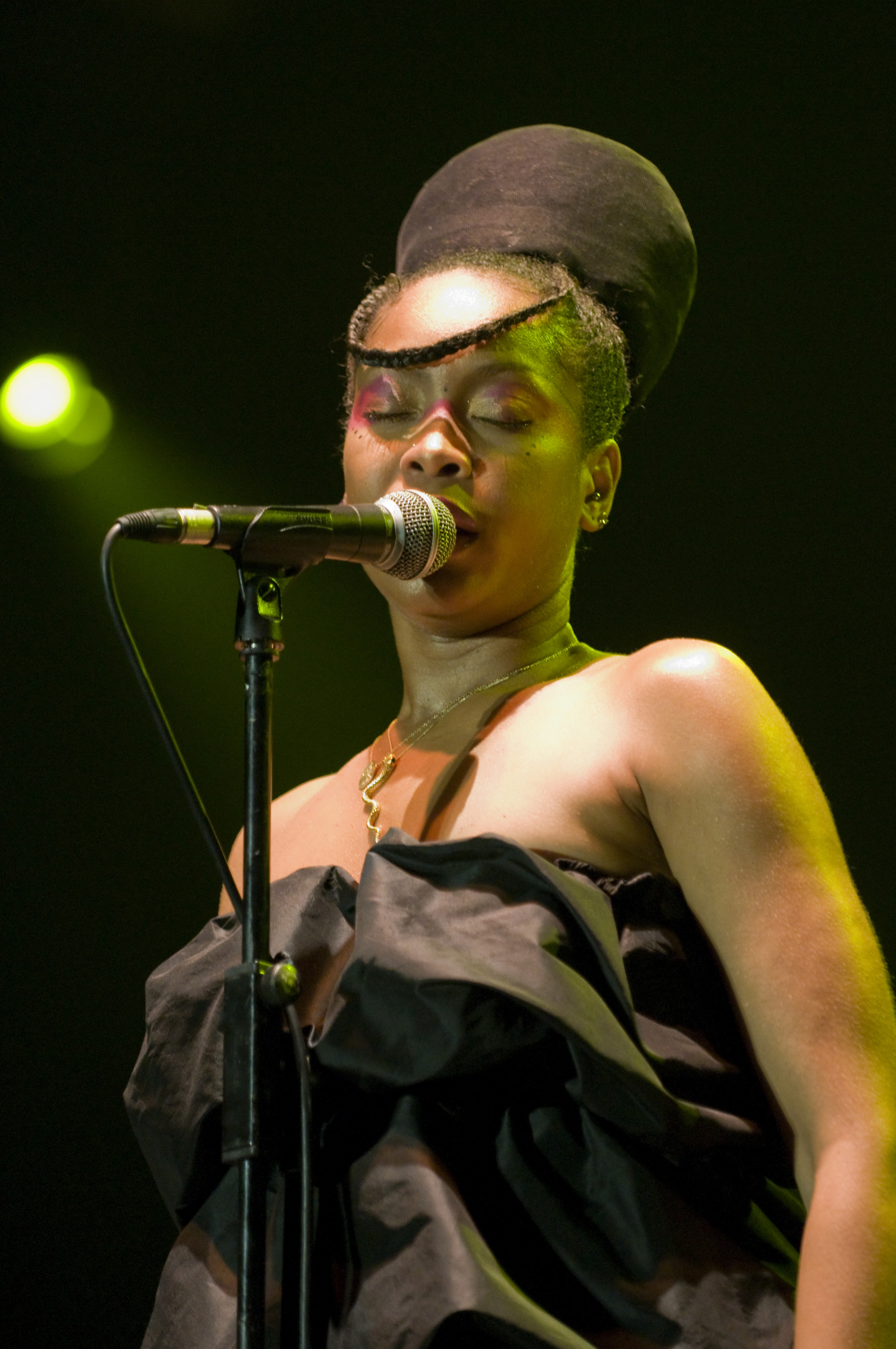
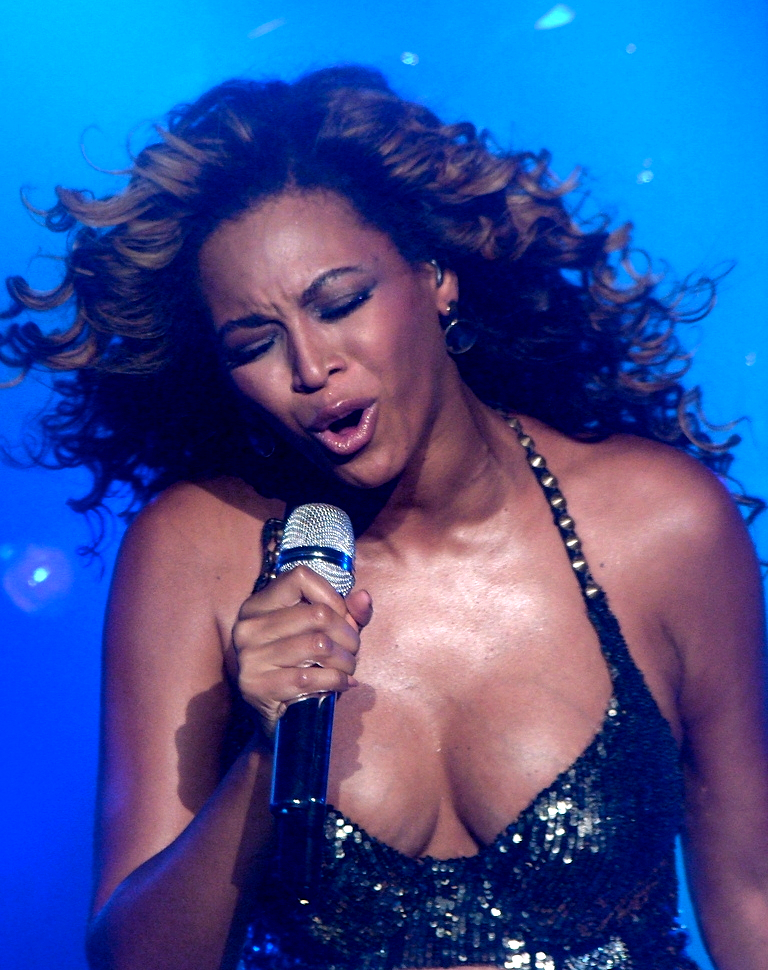
Erykah Badu (left) and Beyoncé (right) both influenced Cheryl's album.

The opening track "Under the Sun" was produced and co-written by Alex da Kid. Lyrically, it speaks of a male telling a girl anything she wants to hear to get his way. The second track "Call My Name" was both produced and written by Scottish producer Calvin Harris. The lyrics speak on an "elusive lover". The third song from the album "Craziest Things" is a dubstep track that features American singer will.i.am. "Craziest Things" was co-written by Cheryl and will.i.am and was produced by will.i.am. Lyrically, the song gives an insight into Cheryl's personal attitude towards relationships. The fourth track "Girl in the Mirror" is a dance and R&B song that was written by Justin Abraham Gray and Sophie Stern and was produced by Panther. Lyrically, it speaks about girls giving themselves a hard time. The title track "A Million Lights" is a ballad which was written by Daniel James, Leah Haywood and Lindz and produced by Dreamlab. Cheryl described the song as an indie-sounding song, comparing it to the band Snow Patrol. The sixth song for the album "Screw You" features British rapper Wretch 32. "Screw You" is an urban song, produced by Hy-Grade and written by Megan Nicolle Thomaston, Kingsley Brown, Daniel Traynor and Jermaine Scott, that starts off as a ballad, but changes into electro-synths. The seventh tack on the album "Love Killer" is a dubstep, mid-tempo song. The song has squiggly synths, a squelching bass and a dubstep beat.

"Love Killer" was produced by Dada Life. Lyrically the song is about falling in love with someone that keeps letting you down. The eighth song "Ghetto Baby" is an R&B song influenced by synthpop and trip hop which was written by American singer Lana Del Rey with Roy Kerr and Anu Pillai and produced by Kid Gloves. The ninth track "Sexy Den a Mutha" was written and produced by Beanz. "Sexy Den a Mutha" is a dance song and is described as a "dancefloor hit" The tenth track from the album "Mechanics of the Heart" is a ballad which was both produced and written by British singer Taio Cruz. Lyrically, the song speaks about a male who's had his heart broken by a previous lover. The eleventh and final track from the standard edition of the album "All is Fair" which was described as a "dark song" and was produced and written by Beanz. "All is Fair" features the use of a helicopter and lyrically it speaks about her fans (soldiers) for supporting her. The deluxe tracks are: "Dum Dum", an electropop song with dubstep influence; "Last One Standing", a dance-pop up-tempo ballad; "Boys Lie", an electropop and dubstep track; and "One Thousand, an electronic song with a dubstep and synthpop beat. The third track for the deluxe edition and fourteenth in all "Telescope" is a slow ballad which features a piano.

== Singles ==
The lead single from the album, "Call My Name" featuring Calvin Harris was uploaded on 19 April onto Cheryl's YouTube account. The song debuted on Capital FM's breakfast show on 20 April 2012. On 2 May 2012, the full-length music video premiered. The single was written and produced by Harris and was released digitally on 18 May 2012. The video for the single was directed by Anthony Mandler and shot in Downtown Los Angeles. "Call My Name" was added to BBC Radio 1's A-list playlist in the week preceding the single's release. It went on to debut at number 1 with sales of 152,000 the highest of the year so far.

"Under the Sun", the second and final single from the album, was released on 3 September 2012. The accompanying music video was released on 26 July 2012, and it sees Cheryl travel back to the '50s to perform the track while strutting down the street. Further scenes see the singer draped on the bonnet of a classic car and performing a choreographed dance sequence with a handful of businessmen. After the release of the video the song peaked at number twenty-six, before the singles official release date. The song peaked at number 20 on the week ending 30 August 2012, becoming her sixth solo top-twenty single. It has since peaked at number 13.

"Screw You", featuring Wretch 32, was to be released as the third single from the album to coincide with the release of Cheryl's autobiography, but the release was cancelled indefinitely due to Cheryl's reunion with Girls Aloud to celebrate the group's tenth anniversary. Upon the release of A Million Lights, the song debuted on the UK Singles Chart at number 100.

== Release and promotion ==
On 18 April 2012, Cheryl revealed the title of her third studio album, A Million Lights and its release date. Cheryl revealed the album artwork for A Million Lights, as well the official track listing for the standard and deluxe versions of the album via Facebook and her official website on 24 May 2012. The cover features a close-up shot of Cheryl, featuring her hand tattoo, with messy hair over one side of her face. Cheryl wears a bright, lime-green dress and pink lipstick in the shot . The album cover was shot by German photographer Ellen Von Unwerth. On 7 June 2012, Universal Music announced a "super fan deluxe" edition of the album, featuring eight extra bonus tracks, postcards, a special edition box and the first 50 sold would include a signed copy of the disc.

For promotion, Cheryl was interviewed on BBC One's The Graham Norton Show on 8 June 2012. On 18 June 2012, Cheryl signed copies of A Million Lights at the Whiteleys Shopping Centre, Bayswater, London and in-store at HMV on Northumberland Street, Newcastle the following day. On 26 May 2012, it was reported that Cheryl would perform "Call My Name" with live vocals on The Voice UK, following allegedly pre-recorded performances that occurred the previous year on The X Factor UK. It was also reported that The Voice executives always edit the vocals for every artist on the show, and they would "provide some finishing touches to her singing prior to it being broadcast." As the performance began, Cheryl swan-dived onto her backing dancers before they performed a highly elaborate routine. Following the broadcast, Cheryl received mixed comments from viewers, with a few who accused the singer of lip synching, while others, including pop singers Emma Bunton and will.i.am, praised the performance. In an interview with BBC News, Cheryl addressed the negative comments, and said that "if you think my live vocal sounds so good it must be mimed, I'm happy, I take it as a compliment." She performed the track again on The Graham Norton Show on 8 June 2012, and was once again accused of lip synching.

Cheryl also performed "Call My Name" at Capital FM's Summertime Ball on 9 June 2012 as a surprise act. On 16 June 2012, Cheryl performed at London's G-A-Y club, debuting several new tracks from the LP. She then performed the same setlist of songs on T4 the following day. On 8 September 2012, Cheryl performed "Under the Sun" on the Jonathan Ross show. She then performed "Under the Sun" and "Call My Name" along with "Fight for This Love" at The Voice concert in Denmark on 24 September 2012. On 19 October 2012, Cheryl performed "Call My Name" and "Under the Sun" at the charity fundraiser Stand Up for Cancer, however there were technical problems during the former performance. On 9 December 2012, she performed at the Jingle Bell Ball. Cheryl then released a music video for the song "Ghetto Baby" on 25 December 2012.

=== Tour ===
To further promote A Million Lights, Cheryl embarked on her first solo concert tour, A Million Lights Tour. On 12 June 2012, via Cheryl's official website Cheryl announced the tour, which started on 3 October 2012 and ended on 17 October 2012. The tour comprised 11 show dates, 2 in Ireland, 1 in Scotland and 8 in England. The London concert was broadcast on ITV2 in November 2012, with a DVD titled A Million Lights: Live at The O_{2} being released shortly afterwards.

== Critical reception ==
Professional ratings
Review scores
Source	Rating
AllMusic	3/5 stars
BBC Music	positive
Digital Spy	3/5 stars
entertainment.ie	2.5/5 stars
The Guardian	3/5 stars
The Independent	3/5 stars
MTV UK	9/10 stars
MSN Music	positive
musicOMH	3.5/5 stars
Virgin Media	3/5 stars

A Million Lights received mainly mixed to positive reviews upon its release. Saun Kitchener from Entertainmentwise.com described the album as being a progression from Cheryl's previous albums 3 Words and Messy Little Raindrops. Kitchner added that "it's surprisingly sparse on the dance-pop-anthem front. She may not have the best voice in the business by quite some distance, but you wouldn't go to a Cheryl concert expecting an Adele-style showcase of vocal acrobatics. You'd go for the performance and, most importantly, for the Grade-A pop music. And A Million Lights has that in spades. Al Fox of BBC Music described it as a "scrapbook of 2012 trends" and wrote that "it's the most sincere moments that prove standouts on Cheryl's new album." Andy Gill from The Independent described it as Cheryl's "most confident set yet" and awarded it 3 stars out of 5. Laurence Green from musicOMH rated it 3.5 out of 5 stars, commenting: "On A Million Lights, it feels like this is the logical culmination of everything Cheryl has been fine-tweaking ever since she first donned that military outfit for "Fight for This Love". It's been a long old war of attrition in Camp Cole, but on A Million Lights, it's a resolute mission accomplished; an end-product that both the casual fan and most die-hard 'soldier' will enjoy." David Smith of Evening Standard rated it 3 out of 5 stars, commenting: "It could be sung by anybody, but it is a buzzing collection of the latest sharp pop sounds, bursting with potential hits." MTV UK wrote that overall, the album is a "mixed-bag of genre's in which Cole finds her musical identity away from Girls Aloud, as well as giving fans a glimpse at her own preference when it comes her taste in music." Ian Gittins of Virgin Media gave the album 3 out of 5 stars and wrote: "A Million Lights, her third album, is a slick and polished summary of the state of the art of current chart-pop but it lacks the indefinable alchemy, personality and touch of magic that makes for truly great pop."

Stephen Thomas Erlewine from Allmusic rated the album 3 out of 5 stars, commenting: "Even if A Million Lights winds up not generating a big single, there is no denying that it captures much of the style and sound of 2012; it's a pop scrapbook, perhaps one that will be more interesting in the future than it is in the present." He picked "Under the Sun", "Call My Name", "A Million Lights" and "Ghetto Baby" as the highlights on the album. Alexis Petridis from The Guardian gave the album 3 out of 5 stars, writing that "You can't fault its box-ticking efficiency, but it's hard to ignore the variable standards." Petridis also wrote that "What comes in between is sometimes interesting, often generic, with a few decent songs among the will-this-do numbers." Robert Copsey of Digital Spy gave the album three out of five stars writing: "Those looking for answers or indeed any indication of the real Cheryl will be disappointed with A Million Lights, which boasts an exceptional lineup of today's best and brightest producers. As such, those looking for an album's worth of decent pop will be more than satisfied here. There's a niggling detachment between Cheryl and her songs and little to no carving of Cheryl's sound as you'd expect from a third record, but as a collection of neat pop explosions built for the masses, it's difficult to fault." John Balfe from Entertainment.ie gave the album 2.5 out of 5 stars, expressing a mixed opinion, writing: "A Million Lights will sell the majority of its units based on Cheryl's persona and perceived charisma more than its songwriting nous. In fact, Cheryl didn't write any of the tracks on the album. When an album is conceived in such an impersonal manner it's difficult to feel anything but ambivalence towards it." Laura Hills from MSN Music opined: "A Million Lights is the equivalent of pop painting by numbers. It's almost like Cheryl and her team have entered the entire contents of the top 40 over the past 10 years and come up with an equation for achieving chart success."

== Chart performance ==
Before the album release, A Million Lights had doubled the amount of pre-orders to her nearest competitor Justin Bieber with his album Believe on the Amazon UK store. However, A Million Lights debuted at number 2 on the UK Album Chart selling 34,934 copies in its first week on sale, with Bieber selling 3,181 more copies and beating her to the number 1 spot. The album also became her first not to debut at number 1 in the UK and her first not to sell over 100,000 copies in its first week on sale. Previous album 3 Words sold 125,000 copies while its follow-up Messy Little Raindrops sold around 105,000 copies in their first weeks. A Million Lights was certified Gold in the United Kingdom for shipments of 100,000 copies.

== Track listing ==
No.	Title	Writer(s)	Producer(s)	Length
1.	"Under the Sun"	Alex da Kid; Mike Del Rio; Jayson DeZuzio; Steven Battey; Carlos Battey; Cheryl Cole	Alex da Kid	3:30
2.	"Call My Name"	Calvin Harris	Harris; Kuk Harrell^{[a]}	3:28
3.	"Craziest Things" (featuring will.i.am)	William Adams; Cole; Shahid Khan; Andrea Martin	will.i.am; Naughty Boy^{[b]}	3:13
4.	"Girl in the Mirror"	Aaron Cowan; Jareth Rwamafa-Johnson	Pantha	3:30
5.	"A Million Lights"	Greg Bonnick; Leon Price; Peter Renshaw; Tom Havelock	Agent X; Brian Rawling^{[a]}; Paul Meehan^{[a]}	3:23
6.	"Screw You" (featuring Wretch 32)	Megan Nicolle Thomaston; Kingsley Brown; Daniel Traynor; Jermaine Scott	HyGrade; Jim Beanz^{[a]}	3:37
7.	"Love Killer"	Stefan Engblom; Olle Corneer; Kasia Livingston	Dada Life; Rawling^{[a]}; Meehan^{[a]}	3:47
8.	"Ghetto Baby"	Elizabeth Grant; Roy Kerr; Anu Pillai	Kid Gloves; Jim Beanz^{[a]}	2:49
9.	"Sexy Den a Mutha"	James "Jim Beanz" Washington; Thomaston	Jim Beanz	3:40
10.	"Mechanics of the Heart"	Taio Cruz; Mathias Wollo; Loick Essien	Cruz; Wollo	3:16
11.	"All Is Fair"	Washington; Candice Nelson	Jim Beanz	3:25
Total length:				37:30

International edition and digital reissue bonus track
No.	Title	Writer(s)	Producer(s)	Length
12.	"Last One Standing"	Billy Wes; Onique "Sparrow" Williams	The Beamer Boyz; Billy Wes	3:10
Total length:				40:40

Deluxe edition bonus tracks
No.	Title	Writer(s)	Producer(s)	Length
12.	"Boys Lie"	Washington; Roy "Dyshon" Warren; Koil Preample	Jim Beanz	3:39
13.	"One Thousand"	Edvard Forre Erfjord; Henrik Barman Michelsen; Robert Rosiji-Griffith; L Marshall	Electric; Bibi Jones Beats; L Marshall^{[a]}	3:43
14.	"Telescope"	Dave Munday; Cara Salimando	Dave Munday; Rawling^{[a]}; Meehan^{[a]}	2:32
15.	"Last One Standing"	Billy Wes; Williams	The Beamer Boyz; Billy Wes	3:10
Total length:				50:32

Super deluxe edition bonus disc
No.	Title	Writer(s)	Producer(s)	Length
1.	"Boys Lie"	Washington; Warren; Preample	Jim Beanz	3:39
2.	"One Thousand"	Erfjord; Michelsen; Rosiji-Griffith; L Marshall	Electric; Bibi Jones Beats; L Marshall^{[a]}	3:43
3.	"Telescope"	Dave Munday; Salimando	Dave Munday; Rawling^{[a]}; Meehan^{[a]}	2:32
4.	"Last One Standing"	Billy Wes; Williams	The Beamer Boyz; Billy Wes	3:10
5.	"I Like It"	Washington; Nelson; Cole	Jim Beanz	3:44
6.	"Make You Go"	Cameron Roberson; David Loeffler; Jaylien Wesley	Wesley	3:29
7.	"Dum Dum"	B Wes; J Friday; Williams	The Beamer Boyz; Billy Wes	3:19
8.	"Teddy Bear"	Washington; Cole	Jim Beanz	4:00
Total length:				29:28

Notes

- ^{^a} signifies a vocal producer
- ^{^b} signifies a co-producer

== Personnel ==
Credits for A Million Lights adapted from AllMusic.

- Cheryl – primary artist, lead vocals, composer, co-writer
- Will.i.am – VDrum sequencing, engineer, featured artist, background vocals, producer, synthesizer, composer, co-writer
- Wretch 32 – featured artist, vocals, co-writer
- Lana Del Rey – co-writer, composer, background vocals
- Calvin Harris – arranger, producer, writer, composer, instrumentation, mixing
- Taio Cruz – composer, producer, co-writer
- Jim Beanz – mixing, producer, vocal producer, additional vocals, backing vocals, co-writer
- Jaylien Wesley – writer, composer
- Agent X – Drums, engineer, keyboards, piano, producer, programming
- Josie Aiello – background vocals
- Carlos Battey – composer
- Steven Battey – composer
- Tim Blacksmith – management
- Riki Bleau – management
- Greg Bonnick – composer
- Delbert Bowers – assistant
- Kingsley Brown – composer
- J. Browz – bass, guitar
- A. J. Clarke – mixing assistant
- Olle Corneér – composer
- Aaron Cowan – composer
- Dada Life – producer
- Danny D. – management
- Mike Del Rio – composer
- Jayson DeZuzio – composer
- Dylan Dresdow – mixing
- Stefan Engblom – composer
- Loick Essien – composer
- Matt Furmidge – vocal engineer
- Chris Galland – assistant
- John Gudwin – engineer
- Stuart Hardie – design
- Kuk Harrell – vocal producer
- Tom Havelock – composer
- Hygrade – instrumentation, producer, programming, vocal producer
- Padraic Kerin – engineer
- Roy Kerr – keyboards, programming
- Kid Gloves – producer, vocal producer
- Alex Da Kid – composer, producer
- Koil – engineer, mixing
- Kasia Livingston – composer
- Peter Mack – assistant
- Ayah Marar – background vocals
- Manny Marroquin – mixing
- Mike Marsh – mastering
- Jaime Martinez – mixing assistant
- Paul Meehan – vocal producer
- Naughty Boy – producer
- Naweed – mastering
- Candice Nelson – composer
- Chris "Tek" O'Ryan – engineer
- Pantha Bass – electric guitar, keyboards, producer
- Joe Peluso – engineer
- Anu Pillai – brass arrangement, engineer, guitar, keyboards, programming, string arrangements
- Leon Price – composer
- Brian Rawling – vocal producer
- Peter Renshaw – composer
- Jareth Rwamafa Johnson – composer, background vocals
- Jermaine Scott – composer
- Stefan Sundström – mixing
- Megan Nicolle Thomaston – composer, background vocals
- Daniel Traynor – composer
- Kevin Verchel – vocal arrangement
- Ellen Von Unwerth – photography
- James "Jim Beanz" Washington – composer
- Mathias Wollo – composer, instrumentation, mixing, producer, programming

== Charts ==
Chart (2012)	Peak position
Australian Digital Albums (ARIA)	39
Belgian Albums (Ultratop Wallonia)	144
Irish Albums (IRMA)	2
Polish Albums (ZPAV)	78
Scottish Albums (OCC)	1
Spanish Albums (PROMUSICAE)	96
UK Albums (OCC)	2
UK Album Downloads (Official Charts)	1

== Certifications ==
Region	Certification	Sales/shipments
United Kingdom (BPI)	Gold	100,000

== Release history ==
Region	Date	Format(s)	Label	Edition(s)
Ireland	15 June 2012	CD, digital download	Polydor Records	Standard, deluxe
Brazil	15 June 2012	Digital download	Universal Music	Standard, deluxe
Taiwan	15 June 2012	Digital download	Universal Music	Standard, deluxe
United Kingdom	18 June 2012	CD, digital download	Fascination, Polydor Records	Standard, deluxe, super deluxe boxset
Poland	19 June 2012	CD, digital download	Universal Music	Standard
Italy	19 June 2012	CD, digital download	Universal Music	Standard
Australia	22 June 2012	CD, digital download	Universal Music	Standard
Hungary	25 June 2012	CD, digital download	Universal Music	Standard, deluxe
Taiwan	6 July 2012	CD	Universal Music	Deluxe

== See also ==
- List of 2012 albums
- List of number-one albums of 2012 (Scotland)
- List of UK Album Downloads Chart number ones of the 2010s
