= Cheryl: My Story =

Book by Cheryl

- Author: Cheryl Tweedy; Rachel Murphy
- Language: English
- Genre: Autobiography
- Publisher: Harper
- Publication date: 11 October 2012
- Publication place: United Kingdom
- Media type: Print
- Pages: 320
- ISBN: 978-0007500154

Cheryl: My Story is an autobiography written by the British recording artist Cheryl, who was known at the time as Cheryl Cole, co-written with Rachel Murphy. It was published by Harper on 11 October 2012. In addition to dealing with her childhood and her rise to fame as a member of the girl group Girls Aloud, Cheryl also discusses her volatile marriage with the footballer Ashley Cole, her life-threatening battle with malaria and her relationship with The X Factor boss Simon Cowell. While Cheryl was the subject of criticism for some of the book's content, Cheryl: My Story was well received by entertainment critics, who complimented the candid nature of the autobiography. It topped The Sunday Times Bestseller list, selling an average of 2,000 copies a day in its first five months of release.

== Conception ==
In April 2012, it was reported that Cheryl had signed a deal with HarperCollins to release an autobiography in November of that year.

Cheryl decided to write an autobiography to "set the record straight." Cheryl stated, "I'm sick of reading lies and I'm sick of reading misquotes. Enough was enough, it was time to put out my side of the story and the truth." She added, "It was a battle with myself, how I normally am, because I am a very private person." Cheryl confessed that she knew the autobiography would be "frank and open. It was the best thing for me at that time. Just putting all the rumours to bed." Appearing on British daytime television programme This Morning in September 2012, Cheryl told Denise van Outen, "I've actually got a lot of stuff to say and things to put straight and it's been a cathartic experience – more than I thought."

The book was co-authored by Rachel Murphy, who has ghost-written a number of other Sunday Times Bestselling books. Cheryl revealed the autobiography's cover on Twitter on 3 October 2012, tweeting "It's REALLY here !!!! #Emotional."

== Synopsis ==
The book's earliest chapters deal with Cheryl's childhood in Newcastle upon Tyne, England. Cheryl discusses smoking cannabis as a teenager, watching friends become hooked on heroin when the drug flooded their estate and seeing her elder brother Andrew sent to prison. She reveals that Andrew and her sister Gillian learned that Cheryl's father Garry wasn't their real dad, causing both of them to turn to alcohol, drugs and crime in various capacities. Cheryl also writes about an infamous altercation with a nightclub washroom attendant in January 2003, which led her to be found guilty of assault occasioning actual bodily harm later that year. Cheryl maintains in the autobiography that the woman hit her first.

Cheryl: My Story captures Cheryl's rise to fame on the ITV reality television programme Popstars: The Rivals, which led to the formation of girl group Girls Aloud. Alongside Nadine Coyle, Sarah Harding, Nicola Roberts and Kimberley Walsh, Girls Aloud released twenty consecutive top ten singles and became the United Kingdom's biggest selling girl group of the 21st century. Cheryl discusses her relationship with her bandmates, particularly the alleged rift with Coyle that garnered extensive tabloid attention. In 2008, Coyle failed to attend the BRIT Awards with her bandmates, stating "it's not my thing." Cheryl discusses how Nadine Coyle living in the United States and attempting to launch a solo career took its toll in the group, culminating in the Out of Control Tour in 2009. Cheryl writes, "Having her manager actually on tour with us was crossing the line, and that’s when I knew that it was finally time for us to take a break." However, Cheryl denies rumors of any actual rift between her and Coyle.

In the book, Cheryl "does not hold back when writing about other significant characters in her life, most notably former husband Ashley Cole and former boss Simon Cowell." For the first time, Cheryl details her divorce from Ashley Cole following his adultery, detailing the moment she found out he had cheated on her with hairdresser Aimee Walton. She confesses to "shaking him, kicking and scratching his face." Cheryl turned to medical help to cope with the divorce, confessing to taking minor tranquilisers. She admits to visiting a sexual health clinic following his infidelity.

Cheryl details her relationship with Simon Cowell, who originally offered her a position as a judge on Britain's Got Talent. In 2008, Cheryl replaced Sharon Osbourne on the judges panel for series five of The X Factor. Cheryl remained on the show for two more series before Cowell offered her a job on season one of The X Factor US, before her role was taken by Nicole Scherzinger. Cheryl talks that Cowell should’ve at least told her himself that she would be replaced by Scherzinger, instead of by a show producer. Cheryl talks about her time on The X Factor UK, referencing her time mentoring contestants such as Cher Lloyd and Katie Waissel.

Cheryl also discusses her battle with malaria, which she contracted during a 2010 trip to Tanzania with friend Derek Hough. During her bout with malaria, Cheryl sent four days in an intensive care unit and spent a further week of respite at the London clinic. She writes that she was so "frightened and exhausted" during her illness that the thought of death "relieved" her. Both of Cheryl's lungs were filled with fluid, while her liver grew to three times its normal size. She was close to needing lifelong dialysis.

Cheryl: My Story also deals with Cheryl's distaste for invasive news media and paparazzi, citing a specific incident in which someone attempted to take a picture of her suffering from malaria in hospital. Cheryl's also recalls climbing Mount Kilimanjaro with bandmate Kimberley Walsh and other celebrities for Comic Relief, as well as her friendship with Dancing with the Stars dancer and choreographer Derek Hough. Cheryl described Hough as "one of the most kind and sensitive and gentlemanly men I have ever met," adding that he was by her side throughout her malaria battle and departure from The X Factor.

== Release ==
Prior to the book's release, Cheryl: My Story was serialised exclusive by the British tabloid newspaper The Sun in the week preceding its publication.

The book was originally published in hardcover by Harper on 11 October 2012 in the United Kingdom, preceding its paperback release on 11 April 2013. An E-book release of the autobiography was also made available. In addition to capitalizing on the Christmas market, the publication of Cheryl: My Story also accompanied the tenth-anniversary reunion of Girls Aloud. Cheryl held a book signing at the Corinthia Hotel London on 1 December 2012. The autobiography was also released by HarperCollins in select international markets. It received a Canadian release on 23 October 2012, followed by an Australian release on 1 November 2012.

== Reception ==
=== Critical response ===
Heat joked, "Forget Fifty Shades of Grey – this is the sensational page-turner everyone will be talking about." NOW called the autobiography "startingly honest." Hello magazine said that the book was "set to fly off the shelves and tell a few home truths." Fran Frith of Yuppee magazine wrote, "I’m not ashamed to admit that it was a gripping read and I was genuinely excited to see what the next chapter would reveal." Michelle Davies of the Daily Express gave the autobiography four stars out of five. Davies commented, "Cheryl’s autobiography really excels is in its early chapters, when she writes about growing up in Newcastle." Regarding the chapters on her divorce from Ashley Cole, Davies wrote, "What she writes is ugly, raw and heartbreaking: the portrait of a young woman madly in love who is devastated by her husband’s betrayal." Davies felt that Cheryl's "continual complaints about the press" were less enjoyable, recognizing that while "she deserves some sympathy […], her complaints wear a bit thin when they come within a 300-page book detailing her entire life."

=== Response from subjects ===
Cheryl's former husband, Chelsea F.C. and England footballer Ashley Cole, was warned that his infidelities would be discussed in the book. Cheryl personally gave him a copy of the book prior to its publication, as it was "only fair." A source told the Sunday Mirror, "Ashley knew what the book was going to say as he had seen it beforehand. He sees this as a bit like his comeuppance. He knows what he did was wrong and he has apologised to Cheryl. They always spoke after the split and throughout the divorce. They want one another to be happy now."

Cheryl angered Katie Waissel, who appeared on the seventh series of The X Factor UK, by claiming she only put her through to the live shows to make "good TV." Waissel tweeted at Cheryl: "I thought you were better than this. Shame I trusted you. You live and learn."

Some members of Cheryl's family accused her of cashing in with the book deal. Cheryl's nephew, her sister Gillian's son, has allegedly dealt with bullying at school following the release of the book. Emma Stanners, the girlfriend of Cheryl's brother Andrew, said: "He's got to go to school with everyone saying: 'Your mam used to be a druggie.'" Stanners commented, "I just can't believe where Cheryl is coming from. She can say all this about others but nobody else can say anything about her."

=== Commercial performance ===
Cheryl: My Story topped The Sunday Times Bestseller list. The Guardian reported that Cheryl: My Story had sold on average 2,308 copies a day in the first five months of its release. As of February 2013, the autobiography had sold 274,666 copies, generating £2.5 million in sales.
