= The Jackie Boyz =

American singer-songwriter sibling duo

- Origin: Savannah, Georgia, United States
- Genres: Pop, R&B
- Years active: 2007–2017
- Labels: Universal
- Past members: Carlos Battey; Steven Battey

The Jackie Boyz were an American multi-platinum singer-songwriter duo that consisted of two brothers, Carlos Battey and Steven Battey. The Jackie Boyz were acquired by Universal Music Publishing as songwriters in 2009.

== History ==
The Jackie Boyz were born and raised in Savannah, Georgia, where they began their music careers at the pier on River Street performing in their hometown. Their name comes from their mother Jackie, hence the name. Their father died in 2003, and their mother in 2004, spurring the boys to pursue a music career.

In 2011, the duo won their first Grammy at the 53rd Annual Grammy Awards for their contribution to the David Guetta One Love Club Mix of Madonna's “Revolver”.

In 2018 Steven Battey wrote and co-produced Luke Combs "One Number Away". The song was certified 5× Platinum by the Recording Industry Association of America(RIAA), and has sold 5,000,000 copies in the US as of August 2023.

== Discography ==
Year	Album	Number of Tracks	Release Country	Label
2009
2009	Love & Beyond	16	Japan	Star Base Music
2011
2011	Songs in My Blackberry	14	Japan	Star Base Music
2013	585 Dayz Later	12	America	Star Base Music

== Composition ==
Year	Artist	Song title	Album	Label	Chart position
2009
2009	Flo Rida (featuring Wynter Gordon)	"Sugar" [CERTIFIED PLATINUM]	R.O.O.T.S	ATLANTIC/POE BOY	Billboard HOT 100: 5
2009	Madonna (featuring Lil Wayne)	"Revolver"	Celebration [CERTIFIED PLATINUM]	WARNER BROS.	Billboard HOT DANCE/CLUB SONGS: 4
2009	Justin Bieber	"Down to Earth"; "Love Me"	My World [CERTIFIED PLATINUM]	ISLAND DEF JAM	Billboard DIGITAL SONGS: 43; Billboard HOT 100: 37
2009	David Guetta	"Toy Friend"	One Love	VIRGIN/WARNER BROS.	'UK Albums Chart: 2
2009	David Guetta	"Revolver (Remix)"	Revolver: Remixes	VIRGIN/WARNER BROS.	Finland SIngles Top 20 9
2009	Chris Brown	"Graffiti"	Graffiti	JIVE/ZOMBA MUSIC GROUP	Top R&B/Hip Hop Albums: 1
2009	Peter Andre	"XOXO"	Revelation [CERTIFIED PLATINUM]	MUSHROOM/Sony BMG	'UK Albums Chart: 3
2010
2010	Shontelle	"DJ Made Me Do It"	No Gravity	SRC/MOTOWN	UK R&B Albums: 23
2010	Sean Kingston	"Dumb Love"	Untitled	BELUGA HEIGHTS	Billboard DIGITAL SONGS: 45
2010	Justin Bieber	"Down To Earth"	My Worlds Acoustic [CERTIFIED PLATINUM]	ISLAND DEF JAM	'Billboard HOT 100: 79
2010	David Guetta	"Toy Friend"	One More Love	VIRGIN	N/A
2010	Mann	"Buzzin"; "Reminisce"	Mann's World	BELUGA HEIGHTS	Billboard HEATSEEKERS SONGS: 1
2010	Ron Isley	"No More"	Mr. I	ISLAND DEF JAM	Billboard Adult R&B Songs: 18
2010	Jay Sean (featuring Birdman (entertainer))	"Like This, Like That"	Untitled	CASH MONEY RECORDS	N/A
2010	Sean Kingston and Justin Bieber	"Eenie Meenie" [CERTIFIED PLATINUM]	My World 2.0 [CERTIFIED PLATINUM]	ISLAND DEF JAM	Billboard HOT 100: 15
2010	Sugababes	"Wear My Kiss"	Sweet 7	ISLAND	UK Singles Chart: 7
2011
2011	Big Time Rush	"All Over Again"	Elevate	COLUMBIA/NICK RECORDS	N/A
2011	Keke Palmer	"Walls Come Down"	Awaken Reloaded	Sony	N/A
2012
2012	Diggy	"Glow in the Dark"; "Special Occasion"	Unexpected Arrival	ATLANTIC	Billboard Rap Albums: 2
2012	Cheryl Cole	"Under the Sun"	A Million Lights	POLYDOR	UK Singles Chart: 13
2012	Jay Sean (featuring Tyga)	"Sex 101"	Neon	CASH MONEY RECORDS	Billboard 200: 116
2012	Yu Shirota (featuring Howie Dorough)	"Worth Fighting For"	A Sandglass of Fate	AVEX	N/A
2012	Ardian Bujupi	"That Girl"	To The Top	Sony/BMG GERMANY	German Album Charts: 76; Digital: 10
2012	Overtone	"Nothing Else Matters"	N/A	LABEL E ENTERTAINMENT	N/A
2012	Timomatic	"Moment To Love" [CERTIFIED PLATINUM]	Timomatic	Sony MUSIC AUSTRALIA	N/A
2013
2013	Darin	"That Love"	Exit	UNIVERSAL MUSIC	Swedish Album Chart: 1
2013	Richard Vission featuring Jackie Boyz	"I'll Follow"	N/A	SOLMATIC/VISCIOUS RECORDS	N/A
2013	DJ Sammy featuring Jackie Boyz	"Shut Up & Kiss Me"	N/A	KONTOR RECORDS	German Singles Charts: 65
2013	Madonna (featuring Lil Wayne)	"Revolver" [RE-RELEASE]	"MDNA World Tour"	INTERSCOPE/LIVE NATION	UK Albums Chart: 55
2013	Pee Wee	"Make The Lights Go"	Vive2Life	Sony MUSIC LATIN	Latin Pop Charts: 10
2013	W3 The Future	"Young Forever"	W3 The Future	YOUNG MONEY/UNIVERSAL	N/A
2013	Amy Weber featuring Sean Kingston)	"Dance Of Life (Come Alive)"	N/A	DAUMAN MUSIC	N/A
2014
2014	Candice Glover	"Forever That Man"	Music Speaks	19 RECORDINGS/INTERSCOPE	Top R&B Albums: 3
2014	Candice Glover	"Love Song"	Music Speaks	19 RECORDINGS/INTERSCOPE	Top R&B Albums: 3
2014	Candice Glover	"O Holy Night"	Music Speaks	19 RECORDINGS/INTERSCOPE	Top R&B Albums: 3
2014	Candice Glover	"I Am Beautiful (Acoustic)"	Music Speaks	19 RECORDINGS/INTERSCOPE	Top R&B Albums: 3
2014	Nick Cannon (featuring Afrojack)	"Looking For A Dream"	White People Party Music	NCREDIBLE RECORDS	N/A
2014	Jason Derulo	"Talk Dirty (Spanish Version)"	Tattoos	WARNER BROS	'UK Albums Chart: 5
2014	Jencarlos Canela	"Una Noche"	Jen	UNIVERSAL MUSIC LATINO	Top Latin Albums: 4
2014	Richard Vission and Nightmare featuring Jackie Boyz	"Walking On Sunshine"	N/A	ULTRA RECORDS	N/A
2014	Boyz II Men	"Ladies Man"	Collide	BMG	Billboard Top R&B/Hip Hop Albums: 6
2014	Abraham Mateo	"Todo Termino"	Who I Am	Sony SPAIN	Spanish Songs Chart: 3
2014	Maxi Priest	"Without A Woman"	Easy To Love	VP RECORDS	Billboard Top Reggae Albums: 2
2014	Jake Miller	"Dazed & Confused"	LionHeart	WARNER BROTHERS	Top R&B/Hip Hop Albums: 3
2014	Shaila Durcal	"Choosing Me"	Shaila Durcal	19 RECORDINGS/INTERSCOPE	N/A
2014	Johnny Gill	"Your Body"	Game Changer	SKILLZ RECORDS	Billboard R&B Albums: 6
2014	Johnny Gill featuring New Edition	"This One's For Me And You"	Game Changer	SKILLS RECORDS	Billboard R&B Albums: 6
2015
2015	Charlie Wilson	"Just Like Summertime"	Forever Charlie	RCA	N/A
2015	Jake Miller	"Rumors"	Rumors EP	WARNER BROS	U.S. Rap: 7
2015	Jake Miller	"Yellow Lights"	Rumors EP	WARNER BROS	U.S. Rap: 7
2015	iKON	"M.U.P"	Welcome Back	YG Entertainment	Gaon National Charts: 1
2015	Got7	"Just Right"	Just Right Mini Album	JYP Entertainment	World Digital Charts: 3
2015	Samantha Jade	"Show Me Love"	Nine	Sony AUSTRALIA	Australia Albums (ARIA): 11
