= Promise This =

2010 single by Cheryl Cole

Single by Cheryl Cole

from the album Messy Little Raindrops
- Released: 24 October 2010
- Recorded: 2010
- Studio: Sub Zero Studios (Santa Monica, California)
- Genre: Dance-pop
- Length: 3:23
- Label: Fascination; Polydor
- Songwriters: Priscilla Hamilton; Wayne Wilkins; Christopher Jackson
- Producer: Wayne Wilkins

Cheryl Cole singles chronology
"Parachute" (2010)	"Promise This" (2010)	"The Flood" (2011)

Alternative artwork
- Christmas bundle EP

"Promise This" is a song by English singer Cheryl Cole, taken from her second studio album Messy Little Raindrops (2010). It was released in the United Kingdom and Ireland as the album's lead single on 24 October 2010 by Fascination Records (Polydor Records). The up-tempo dance-pop song was written by American songwriter Priscilla Renea Hamilton, British music producer Wayne Wilkins, and Christopher Jackson and produced by Wilkins. The lyrics to "Promise This" reference Cole's personal life and relationships, as well as incorporating the French language. The single's release came in the aftermath of a public divorce from footballer Ashley Cole, as well as a life-threatening battle with malaria.

The song received generally favourable reviews from music critics. "Promise This" became Cole's second solo number-one single in the United Kingdom and Ireland. As of June 2012, "Promise This" has sold 427,262 copies in the United Kingdom. "Promise This" is accompanied by a Sophie Muller-directed music video featuring Cole dancing as a ballerina. It also features scenes including Cole dressed as a flamenco dancer and a black leotard outfit. She performed the single live on the seventh series of The X Factor on 24 October 2010.

== Background and composition ==
"Promise This" is an up-tempo dance-pop song written by American songwriter Priscilla Hamilton, British music producer Wayne Wilkins, who was responsible for Cole's debut single "Fight for This Love", and Christopher Jackson. It is written in the music key of C minor with a time signature in common time and a tempo of 151 beats per minute. Cole's vocal range spans from G_{3} to E♭_{5}. The chord progression of the song is Cm, B♭, F in the intro, Cm, E♭, B♭, F in the verse and A♭, E♭, B♭, Cm in the chorus and bridge. The song sees Cole singing some of the lyrics in French, referencing the children's song "Alouette". It was recorded in Santa Monica, California, and "finds her contemplating mortality with a cheerful morbidity, asking for prayers over a brutal march beat." Tabloids suggested that the lyrics were based upon her divorce from footballer Ashley Cole, and how her dancer friend Derek Hough nursed her to health while she was suffering from malaria. The Daily Star had also noted Cole's apparent affection in the song by her use of the French word alouette, meaning "skylark".

== Critical reception ==
"Promise This" received generally favourable reviews from music critics. Nick Levine of Digital Spy gave the songs five stars out of five. Levine called the song "a proper bloody corker. 'Promise This' skips along thrillingly from video gamey verses to choruses that shimmer like Cheryl's Saturday night eyelids to, well, those alouettes. The reverby middle 8's pretty ace too." A CBBC Newsround review praised the "thumping dance track" and said "the X Factor judge has a major hit on her hands."

Gavin Martin of the Daily Mirror described the track as "modern electro-pop mash-up with a tribal chorus" and concluded, "A busy, catchy foretaste of Cheryl's forthcoming second album, this should lie comfortably in the Top Five." A reviewer from OK! magazine said "The upbeat, pop track has more of a dance feel than her previous releases but the songstress hasn't failed to impress with this one – we have it on loop!"

== Chart performance ==
"Promise This" debuted at number one on the UK Singles Chart, becoming her second solo UK number one behind "Fight for This Love" (October 2009). It sold 157,210 copies in its debut week, which earned it the highest first-week sales of the year, for a non-charity single at that time. It is Cole's fourth solo consecutive top-five single in the United Kingdom and her second solo chart topper, sixth overall. The following week, Cole's second studio album Messy Little Raindrops topped the UK Albums Chart while "Promise This" dropped to number two, "Promise This" was also successful in Ireland, where it also topped the charts. It had limited success elsewhere, reaching top-fifteen Hungary and top-twenty in Belgium. As of June 2012, Promise This has sold 427,262 copies in the United Kingdom.

== Music video ==
=== Background ===
A frame from the video of "Promise This", where Cheryl Cole appears in a Madonna-esque black leotard.

The video for the song was directed by Sophie Muller and choreographed by Fatima Robinson debuted on 21 September 2010 on UK television channel ITV2. It incorporates scenes of "silhouetted shapes, cut-outs and projected imagery". Digital Spy's Ryan Love described the theme of the video as "dark and glossy". The X Factor official magazine said the video for the song was "gothic ballet". Cole's close friend and bandmate from Girls Aloud, Kimberley Walsh, used her OK! magazine column to say "[Cole's] gone ballerina theme this time – she used to be a great ballerina and went to the London Royal Ballet School, so that's quite fitting."

=== Synopsis ===
In the video Cole wears several outfits, described as "gorgeous" by ITN, including a low-cut red dress, a ballerina's leotard, to a short embellished mini-dress. Cole plays a dominant role in part of the video, waiting for a man in a darkened room in one scene and pushing him to the floor with her foot in another. ITN commented on the second part of the film, "We see a softer side to the 27-year-old though, as she dances in a floaty dress, showing off some of her skills which, as a child, won her a sponsorship to study at London's Royal Ballet Summer School." In one of music video's main outfits, Cole is seen wearing 'Wolford Bondage Tights'. "In one scene she is dressed in a Madonna-styled black leotard and black jacket with her hair pushed back in a high ponytail. Another scene shows her dressed as a ballerina, and there's another one where she wears a red flamenco dress, all in all she looks spectacular."

=== Reception ===
Promonewstv commented positively upon the direction marking that "Sophie Muller delivers this sympathetically earnest promo with both graceful and muscular choreography all adding to the drama". A reviewer from ITN News said remarked that Cole was "looking as sexy as ever" in the video. Stop Press News agreed with earlier reviews commenting that the video is "hot, but is not x rated" comparing it to other female music artists. The review added, "it is sexy, but not something that you would be embarrassed to watch with your family".

== Promotion ==
The single was premiered on Chris Moyles' BBC Radio 1 breakfast show on 14 September, where it was introduced as the lead single from Cole's second studio album, Messy Little Raindrops. In addition to her role as a judge on The X Factor, Cheryl Cole made a high-profile appearance on Piers Morgan's Life Stories, in which she discussed her marriage and divorce with Ashley Cole and her life-threatening battle with malaria. The show's ratings reached an all-time high. On 24 October, Cole performed "Promise This" on The X Factor's results show. She donned a white tuxedo jacket, "frilly black knickers," knee-high zebra print tights, and leather boots and was joined by multiple back-up dancers. She "showcased her vocal and dancing skills with an energetic, raunchy routine that earned a standing ovation from her fellow judges." Similar to her 2009 performance of "Fight for This Love" on The X Factor, the media speculated whether Cole lip synced or not.

- The X Factor – 24 October 2010
- Children in Need 2010 – 19 November 2010
- Alan Carr: Chatty Man – 20 December 2010
- A Million Lights Tour – October 2012
- Jingle Bell Ball – 8 December 2012

== Covers ==
British recording artist Adele covered "Promise This" on 27 January 2011 for BBC Radio 1's Live Lounge.

== Track listing ==
CD single

1. "Promise This" – 3:23
2. "Promise This" (Digital Dog Remix Edit) – 3:47

Digital remix – Exclusive to Nokia Store

1. "Promise This" (Nu Addiction Dub Mix)

Digital EP

1. "Promise This" – 3:23
2. "Promise This" (Nu Addiction Radio Edit) – 3:31
3. "Promise This" (Almighty Radio Edit) – 4:04
4. "Promise This" (Digital Dog Remix Edit) – 3:47

Digital EP – The Remixes

1. "Promise This" (Mayday's Club Mix) – 4:10
2. "Promise This" (Nu Addiction Club Mix) – 7:52
3. "Promise This" (Almighty Club Mix) – 8:39
4. "Promise This" (Digital Dog Remix) – 6:03
5. "Promise This" (Funkagenda Remix) – 6:47

Digital 'Christmas' EP – Exclusive Free Download in iTunes '12 Days of Christmas' Promotion

1. "Promise This" (Mayday's Drum & Step Mix) – 3:59
2. "Promise This" (Digital Dog Remix Edit – Video) – 3:55
3. "On The Road With Cheryl Cole" (Edit – Video) – 4:09

== Credits and personnel ==
- Songwriting – Priscilla Hamilton, Wayne Wilkins, Christopher Jackson
- Production, keyboards and programming – Wayne Wilkins
- Backing vocals – Priscilla Renea, RaVaughn Brown
- Mixing – Mark Stent
- Mastering – Brian Gardner

== Charts and certifications ==
=== Weekly charts ===
Chart (2010)	Peak position
Australia (ARIA)	78
Belgium (Ultratip Bubbling Under Flanders)	19
Czech Republic Airplay (ČNS IFPI)	17
European Hot 100 Singles	5
Hungary (Rádiós Top 40)	14
Ireland (IRMA)	1
Poland (Polish Airplay New)	5
Scottish Singles Sales (Official Charts)	1
Slovakia Airplay (ČNS IFPI)	32
UK Singles (Official Charts)	1

=== Year-end charts ===
Chart (2010)	Position
Hungarian Airplay Chart	98
UK Singles Chart	39

=== Certifications ===
Region	Certification	Certified units/sales
United Kingdom (BPI)	Gold	490,000

== Release history ==
Region	Date	Format	Label
Denmark	24 October 2010	Digital download (EP, Remixes)	Universal Music
Ireland	24 October 2010	Digital download (EP, Remixes)	Universal Music
United Kingdom	24 October 2010	Digital download (EP, Remixes)	Fascination Records
United Kingdom	25 October 2010	CD single	Fascination Records
Mexico	24 November 2010	Digital download	Universal Music

== See also ==
- List of number-one singles of 2010 (Ireland)
- List of number-one singles from the 2010s (UK)
