= Call My Name (Cheryl song) =

Single by Cheryl

from the album A Million Lights
- Released: 18 May 2012
- Recorded: Fly Eye Studios (London); Henson Studios (Hollywood)
- Genre: Dance-pop; EDM
- Length: 3:28
- Label: Fascination; Polydor
- Songwriter: Calvin Harris
- Producer: Calvin Harris

Cheryl singles chronology
| "The Flood" (2011) | "Call My Name" (2012) | "Under the Sun" (2012) |

"Call My Name" is a song by English singer Cheryl taken from her third studio album, A Million Lights (2012). It was written and produced by Calvin Harris, with Kuk Harrell producing Cole's vocals. It was released as the lead single from the album on 18 May 2012 by Polydor Records' imprint Fascination. "Call My Name" is a dance-pop and EDM song that was compared by critics to songs produced by Harris for other singers.

The track received mostly positive reviews from music critics. Although many thought it was catchy, it was thought to be generic when compared to other songs played on the radio, and is noted for being a departure from Cheryl's previous works. "Call My Name" achieved commercial success on Cheryl's main markets, reaching the top spot of the charts in Ireland, Scotland, the United Kingdom and Poland. The song also became her first and only chart entry in New Zealand, peaking at number 13 and earning a Gold certification in the country.

The accompanying music video was directed by Anthony Mandler, and features Cheryl performing an elaborate dance routine with backup dancers. The release of it was promoted with two teasers, until the full video premiered on 2 May 2012. To promote the song, Cheryl performed the track on The Graham Norton Show, Stand Up to Cancer, Capital FM's Summertime Ball 2012, T4, The Voice UK, and The Voice '12 concert in Denmark.

== Background ==
In March 2012, critics speculated that Calvin Harris and Cheryl were collaborating on a track following a Twitter discussion between them both. When asked if he would like to work with Cheryl, Harris said, "I'd love to work with somebody like Cheryl Cole, she would be great." The following month, it was confirmed that the track was titled "Call My Name", and it would be released as the lead single from Cheryl's third studio album, A Million Lights, on 10 June 2012. The song was written and produced by Harris. The track had its radio premiere on Capital FM's breakfast show on 23 April 2012.

== Composition ==
"Call My Name"
A 21-second sample of the song's chorus features Cole singing over a dance background which borrows similarities to Rihanna's "We Found Love" (2011) and Scissor Sisters' "Only the Horses" (2012).

"Call My Name" is a dance-pop and EDM song written in E♭ major with a time signature in common time and a tempo of 128 beats per minute. The vocal range from the singer spans from C_{4} to C_{5}. "Call My Name" borrows similarities to Rihanna's "We Found Love" (2011) and Scissor Sisters' "Only the Horses" (2012), tracks that were also produced by Harris. Brogan Driscoll of The Huffington Post speculated that the "dance anthem" title, "Call My Name", could be linked Cheryl's recent decision to drop her married name from her professional career. Sarah Deen of Metro stated that the track features a "typical Calvin Harris beat and singalong chorus", the chorus of the song was considered a departure from Cheryl's previous works, namely "Fight for This Love" (2009) and "Promise This" (2010), while Marie Claire columnist Eleanor Young described "Call My Name" as a "fast paced party track". When Peter Robinson of Popjustice compared the song to "We Found Love" during an interview with the singer, she responded, "that's going to be natural because it's Calvin. They're both Calvin-produced songs. So naturally you're going to think that. But if you play them side by side they don't sound the same. Although you might naturally think that, because it's the same producer. It's not a bad thing." She also said that the lyrics of the song don't have a meaning, but they do have a feeling: "I think it's quite a sexy lyric? Um… It's really not that deep. We're not saving the world with lyrics or anything."

== Critical response ==
"Call My Name" received mostly positive reviews from music critics. Bill Lamb of About.com explained that, after many believed that rejecting her judge role on the US version of The X Factor in 2011 would be a career setback, the release of the "hot, current dance pop" track proved them wrong. Writing for the same website, DJ Ron Slomowicz stated that, despite being "a little generic" when compared to mainstream tracks, "there's still something undeniably catchy about the track." Robert Copsey of Digital Spy rated "Call My Name" four out of five stars, and added: "unsurprisingly, is a ballsy dance anthem about an elusive lover complete with a foot-stomping trance section that becomes more addictive with each listen." Copsey also added that it isn't the "greatest song of all time, nor the most original you'll hear this year, but the feeling we get from it more than makes up for it." Robbie Daw of Idolator said that, despite not being innovative, the song has catchy hooks and melodies that "manage to grab you from the first listen, no matter how familiar they might sound."

NME reviewer Issy Sampson explained that the track is so addictive after a few listens that "you’ll find yourself driving to Cheryl’s house, at 4.35am on a Tuesday, crying uncontrollably and muttering something about HER calling YOUR name." Entertainment Wise reviewer Wil Jones also thought that "Call My Name" wasn't innovative, and compared it to productions by David Guetta, saying, "a bit of a drop there, the same old floor-to-the-floor beat here, a big synth-y chorus that’s meant to be anthemic but isn’t really, over-produced, bland vocals. 'Call My Name' is isn’t by no means terrible, it’s just very blah." Similarly, Jenn Selby of Glamour noted that "Call My Name" bears resemblance to other productions by Harris, yet admitted that she was surprised with the result of their collaboration, while Elena Gorgan of Softpedia said that the song has everything to become the summer's hottest anthem. The Guardian critic Alexis Petridis gave the song a mixed review, criticizing it for being generic and adding that it lacks "the spark that powered Rihanna's We Found Love."

== Chart performance ==
Hours after its official release on the iTunes Store in the United Kingdom, "Call My Name" reached the top position of the UK store's chart. With only three days of release, the track sold a total of 97,000 units in the United Kingdom alone. After a full week of sales, "Call My Name" sold a total of 152,001 digital copies in the country, becoming 2012's fastest selling number one single on the UK Singles Chart until December of the same year, when The X Factor winner James Arthur sold 490,560 copies with his cover of Shontelle's "Impossible". "Call My Name" was the 34th best-selling single of 2012 in the UK where it eventually sold 600,000 copies to achieve Platinum status in 2021. "Call My Name" also debuted and peaked at number one in Ireland. On its second charting week, the track fell to number two in place of Maroon 5 and Wiz Khalifa's "Payphone" having sold 70,640 copies. "Call My Name" entered the New Zealand Singles Chart at number 25 on 2 July 2012, climbing into the top twenty four weeks later, peaking at number 13. It earned a Gold certification from the Recording Industry Association of New Zealand for selling over 7,500 units there. "Call My Name" failed to make such impact on the Australian Singles Chart, peaking at number 49.

== Music video ==
The music video for "Call My Name" was directed by Anthony Mandler and filmed in Los Angeles, California in March 31, 2012. A 15-second teaser was unveiled on 25 April 2012, followed by an extended version five days later. The music video officially premiered on 2 May 2012. It starts with a quote from French writer and philosopher the Marquis de Sade that reads, "The only way to a woman's heart is along the path of torment." This is followed by scenes of Cheryl strutting down a graffiti-daubed storm drain before meeting with her dancers and performing an elaborate dance routine in the Los Angeles River while wearing a neon yellow bra. This scene is a reference to the drag race scene in the 1970s musical film Grease. The camera cuts intermittently to footage filmed on the London Eye before the California shoot, which shows Cheryl posing through the reflection on the capsule window. Scenes of the singer driving a car over and posing on a Los Angeles bridge are intercalated later in the video. It received mixed reviews from critics. Jo Usmau of the Daily Mirror said that the video "doesn't disappoint", and, regarding the dance sequences, stated that "she can really really dance", adding: "Check. Out. Her. Stomach. no wonder she's number two on FHM's 100 Sexiest Women in the World list which was released today." Robbie Daw of Idolator commented that the song itself is better than the video, and added the one thing he learned from it: "when you don’t have a huge budget, spend what you can on clothing, makeup and wigs, and make the most out of the artist’s ample curves."

== Live performances ==
On 26 May 2012, it was reported that Cheryl would perform "Call My Name" with live vocals on The Voice UK, following allegedly pre-recorded performances that occurred the previous year on The X Factor UK. It was also reported that The Voice executives always edit the vocals for every artist on the show, and they would "provide some finishing touches to her singing prior to it being broadcast." As the performance began, Cheryl swan-dived onto her backing dancers before they performed a highly elaborated routine. Following the broadcast, Cheryl received mixed comments from viewers, with a few who accused the singer of lip synching, while others, including pop singers Emma Bunton and will.i.am, praised the performance. In an interview with BBC News, Cheryl addressed the negative comments, and said that "if you think my live vocal sounds so good it must be mimed, I'm happy, I take it as a compliment." She performed the track again on The Graham Norton Show on 8 June 2012, and was also accused of lip synching. Cheryl also performed "Call My Name" at Capital FM Summertime Ball on 9 June 2012 in front of 80,000 fans at the Wembley Stadium, she was a surprise artist. at The Voice '12 concert in Denmark, and at the 2012 Jingle Bell Ball.

== Formats and track listings ==
- Digital download
1. "Call My Name" – 3:28
- Digital EP
1. "Call My Name" – 3:28
2. "Make You Go" – 3:29
3. "Call My Name" (Wideboys Remix) – 3:11
4. "Telescope" – 2:31

== Credits and personnel ==
Recording

- Recorded at Fly Eye Studios, London; Henson Recording Studios, Hollywood.

Personnel

- Josie Aiello — background vocals
- Jacky Wong — dance choreographer
- Cheryl Cole — lead vocals
- Martin Lam — make up artist
- Josh Gudwin — engineer
- Calvin Harris — songwriter, record producer, instruments, mixing
- Kuk Harrell — vocal producer
- Peter Mack — engineer (assistant)
- Ayah Marar — background vocals
- Chris "TEK" O'Ryan — engineer

Credits adapted from the liner notes of A Million Lights.

== Charts ==
=== Weekly charts ===
| Chart (2012) | Peak position |
|---|---|
| Australia (ARIA) | 49 |
| Belgium (Ultratip Bubbling Under Flanders) | 36 |
| Belgium Bubbling Under Dance (Ultratip Flanders) | 9 |
| Belgium Bubbling Under Dance (Ultratip Wallonia) | 4 |
| Czech Republic Airplay (ČNS IFPI) | 48 |
| Euro Digital Songs (Billboard) | 2 |
| Hungary (Rádiós Top 40) | 26 |
| Ireland (IRMA) | 1 |
| Netherlands (Dutch Top 40 Tipparade) | 14 |
| Netherlands (Single Top 100) | 97 |
| New Zealand (Recorded Music NZ) | 13 |
| Poland (Top 5 Video Airplay) | 1 |
| Romania (Romanian Top 100) | 68 |
| Russia Airplay (TopHit) | 14 |
| Scottish Singles Sales (Official Charts) | 1 |
| UK Singles (Official Charts) | 1 |
| Ukraine Airplay (TopHit) | 91 |

=== Year-end charts ===
2012 year-end chart performance for "Call My Name"
| Chart (2012) | Position |
|---|---|
| Russia Airplay (TopHit) | 44 |
| UK Singles (Official Charts Company) | 34 |
| Ukraine Airplay (TopHit) | 99 |

2013 year-end chart performance for "Call My Name"
| Chart (2013) | Position |
|---|---|
| Russia Airplay (TopHit) | 106 |

== Certifications ==
| Region | Certification | Certified units/sales |
|---|---|---|
| New Zealand (RMNZ) | Gold | 7,500^{*} |
| United Kingdom (BPI) | Platinum | 600,000^{‡} |
^{*} Sales figures based on certification alone.^{‡} Sales+streaming figures based on certification alone.

== Release history ==
| Region | Date | Format | Label |
|---|---|---|---|
| United Kingdom | 23 April 2012 | Premiere | Polydor Records |
| Australia | 18 May 2012 | Digital download | Universal Music |
| Brazil | 18 May 2012 | Digital download | Polydor Records |
| Malaysia | 18 May 2012 | Digital download | Universal Music |
| Brazil | 7 June 2012 | Digital EP | Polydor Records |

== See also ==
- List of number-one singles of 2012 (Ireland)
- List of number-one singles of 2012 (Scotland)
- List of Platinum singles in the United Kingdom awarded since 2000
- List of UK Singles Chart number ones of the 2010s
