= Under the Sun (Cheryl song) =

Single by Cheryl

from the album A Million Lights
- Released: 2 September 2012
- Genre: Pop
- Length: 3:29
- Label: Fascination; Polydor
- Songwriters: Alex da Kid; Mike Del Rio; Jayson DeZuzio; Steven Battey; Carlos Battey; Cheryl Cole
- Producer: Alex da Kid

Cheryl singles chronology
| "Call My Name" (2012) | "Under the Sun" (2012) | "Crazy Stupid Love" (2014) |

"Under the Sun" is a song recorded by English singer Cheryl, from her third studio album A Million Lights (2012). The song was released as the second and final single from A Million Lights on 2 September 2012 through Fascination Records (Polydor Records). It was written and produced by Alex da Kid, with additional writing from Mike Del Rio, Jayson DeZuzio, Steven Battey, Carlos Battey, and Cheryl. Lyrically, it speaks of a male telling a female anything she wants to hear to get his way. "Under the Sun" is a mid-tempo song with piano riffs, sun-kissed breakbeats, and a pop chorus.

The song received a positive reaction from most music critics, with most of them, calling it a summery, carefree and enjoyable song. Some critics cited the Chemical Brothers, Natasha Bedingfield, and Lily Allen as references. "Under the Sun" fared commercially well where it debuted on the UK Singles Chart at number 57, climbing to number 13. "Under the Sun", is Cheryl's second single to date that has not entered the top five. "Under the Sun" also peaked at number 16 in Ireland.

The accompanying music video sees Cheryl travel back to the 1950s to perform the track while strutting down the street. Further scenes see the singer draped on the bonnet of a classic car and performing a choreographed dance sequence with a handful of businessmen. "Under the Sun" was promoted with live performances in the United Kingdom, including a T4 special and The Jonathan Ross Show.

== Composition ==
"Under the Sun" (2012)
A 21 second sample of "Under the Sun".

"Under the Sun" was written and produced by Alex da Kid, with additional writing from Mike Del Rio, Jayson DeZuzio, Steven Battey, Carlos Battey and Cheryl. Lyrically, it speaks of a male telling a girl anything she wants to hear to get his way. "Under The Sun" finds her bidding a scornful farewell to an unfaithful lover. "I wont give you my heart because it don't break twice," sings Cheryl. Under the Sun is a mid-tempo song, with hip hop beats, piano riffs, sun-kissed breakbeats and a pop chorus.

Cheryl described the song as being a "really fun song. It's about a guy telling you anything you want to hear to get his way, and you saying, 'actually, normally I wouldn’t, but today I might.' The sun just makes you feel good." Cheryl also expressed that the song is one of her favourites, "At the moment I've got a song that's actually a hip hop beat with a pop verse and that's called Under The Sun. So that's my favourite today! I can't wait!." According to Allmusic's Stephen Thomas Erlewine, on the song Cheryl is adopting a bit of a Natasha Bedingfield hangover.

== Reception ==
=== Critical response ===
Alexis Petridis from The Guardian praised the song, explaining, "Opener Under the Sun offers a weird and hugely enjoyable cocktail of tinny synthesiser, vast Chemical Brothers-style breakbeat and football-terrace backing vocals". Entertainment Wise also gave praise to the song, calling it "exceptional" along with album track "All Is Fair". Al Fox wrote for BBC Music that "the casual, high-spirited Under the Sun boasts a playful, summery, arguably alternative trait." Laura Hills wrote a positive review for MSN Music, calling it "a perfectly acceptable track full of bounce, upbeat vocals and what some may say are obvious references to ex-husband Ashley Cole." Joanne Dorken of MTV called it "a summery, mid-tempo song and provides a bright start to A Million Lights."

Laurence Green from musicOMH analysed that "Under the Sun serves as a thrillingly carefree album opener, all jaunty piano riffs and frat party chants. As one of Cole’s own co-writes, it’s hard not to read into the flippant breeziness of lyrics like "I got paid today, is this really my life, now that I’m over you... I can finally feel alive". In interviews, she might pointedly distance herself from any deeper meaning to the words, but truth be told, it's the way lines like these resonate so closely to Cole's own life that bolsters the album's cohesiveness and marks it out as a body of work that sounds fundamentally like ‘her’." Lewis Corner of Digital Spy agreed, writing, "Cheryl may refuse to admit that her tracks are autobiographical, but when the credits list her as the primary songwriter, it's hard to ignore the song's potential to be a two-fingered salute to those who have attempted to sway her – and more power to her for it." Kim Taylor Bennet from Time Out London called it a "Lily Allen-lite, cheapened instantly to a Magaluf anthem by an inexplicable football chant refrain."

=== Chart performance ===
"Under the Sun" debuted on the UK Singles Chart at number 57, on 11 August 2012. Later, the song jumped to number 36, while on the third week, it climbed to number 26. On 8 September 2012, the song climbed to number 13. This became Cheryl's second single, after "The Flood", that had not entered the top five. "Under the Sun" debuted at number 30 on the Irish Singles Chart, for the week ending 9 August 2012 and went on to peak at number 16 becoming her seventh top-twenty hit in Ireland.

== Music video ==
Cheryl reclining on the bonnet of a classic car while a gang of gents in 50s suits dance around her in the music video for "Under the Sun".

The music video was filmed on 25 June 2012, and was directed by Anthony Mandler. Cheryl also tweeted that she was in music video rehearsals the previous day when the single was first announced. Furthermore, the scenes were filmed at Wimbledon Studios on the former set of the now defunct Channel Five soap "Family Affairs." The accompanying music video was released on 26 July 2012, and it sees Cheryl travel back to the '50s to perform the track while strutting down the street. Further scenes see the singer draped on the bonnet of a classic car and performing a choreographed dance sequence with a handful of businessmen.

The video starts with Cheryl in a crowded café of suited men strolling to a juke box before leaving – attracting the attention of every bloke present. Later, she walks down a decidedly modern street, complete with phone box, bus stop and cash point, before reclining on the bonnet of a classic car while a gang of gents in 50s suits dance around her. After more strutting down the street in her leopard print heels, Cheryl breaks out a routine in front of a flashing background with the help of two shirtless men. As the sun sets, Cheryl walks down a dark street – with yet more dancing – before going back into a café and chatting up a group of soldiers, making sure she nabs a slurp of milkshake on the way.

== Live performances ==
"Under the Sun" was performed live for the first time during Cheryl's T4 special. It was broadcast on Channel 4 on 16 June 2012. "Screw You", "Call My Name" and "Fight For This Love" were also performed. Cheryl performed "Under the Sun" on The Jonathan Ross Show on 8 September.

== Track listing ==
Digital EP

1. "Under the Sun" (Radio Version) - 3:29
2. "Under the Sun" (The Alias Remix / Radio Version) - 3:33
3. "Under the Sun" (Pantha Remix) - 4:16
4. "Under the Sun" (Agent X Bassline Mix) - 5:00

== Charts ==
=== Weekly charts ===
| Chart (2012) | Peak position |
|---|---|
| Ireland (IRMA) | 16 |
| Scottish Singles Sales (Official Charts) | 12 |
| UK Singles (Official Charts) | 13 |

=== Year-end charts ===
| Chart (2012) | Peak position |
|---|---|
| UK Singles (Official Charts Company) | 125 |

== Certifications ==
| Region | Certification | Certified units/sales |
|---|---|---|
| United Kingdom (BPI) | Silver | 200,000^{‡} |
^{‡} Sales+streaming figures based on certification alone.

== Release history ==
| Region | Date | Format | Label |
|---|---|---|---|
| United Kingdom | 2 September 2012 | Digital EP | Polydor |
