= Cheryl (singer) =

English singer and television personality (born 1983)

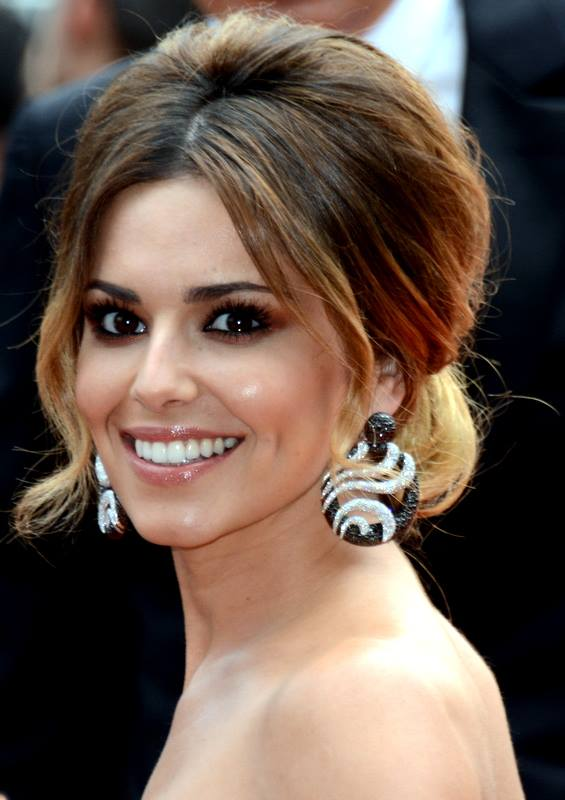
- Cheryl in 2014
- Born: Cheryl Ann Tweedy; 30 June 1983 (age 43); Newcastle upon Tyne, England
- Occupations: Singer; television personality
- Years active: 2002–present
- Works: Solo discography and songs; Girls Aloud discography and songs; videography
- Television: Popstars: The Rivals; The X Factor; The Greatest Dancer
- Spouses: Ashley Cole (m. 2006; div. 2010) Jean-Bernard Fernandez-Versini (m. 2014; div. 2016)
- Partner: Liam Payne (2016–2018)
- Children: 1
- Musical career
- Also known as: Cheryl Cole; Cheryl Fernandez-Versini
- Genres: Pop; dance-pop; R&B
- Instrument: Vocals
- Labels: Polydor; Fascination; 3 Beat
- Member of: Girls Aloud
- Website: cherylofficial.com

Cheryl Ann Tweedy (born 30 June 1983) is an English singer and television personality. She rose to fame as a member of Girls Aloud, a pop girl group created through ITV's reality competition show Popstars: The Rivals in 2002. Named the United Kingdom's best-selling girl group of the 21st century in 2012, Girls Aloud amassed a string of 20 consecutive UK top ten singles (including four number ones), two UK number-one albums, five consecutive platinum-selling studio albums, and five Brit Award nominations, winning Best British Single for "The Promise" in 2009. The group disbanded in 2013 and later reunited for a tour in 2024.

Cheryl began a solo career in April 2009 while still a member of Girls Aloud. Between 2009 and 2014, she released four studio albums: 3 Words (2009), Messy Little Raindrops (2010), A Million Lights (2012), and Only Human (2014). These albums collectively produced ten singles, five of which—"Fight for This Love", "Promise This", "Call My Name", "Crazy Stupid Love", and "I Don't Care"—reached the top position on the UK singles chart, making Cheryl the first British female solo artist to achieve five UK number-one singles.

In 2008, Cheryl became a judge on the British edition of the talent show The X Factor. She mentored two eventual winners (Alexandra Burke in series five and Joe McElderry in series six) before resigning in 2011 after series seven to join the panel of the American edition, which she left during the auditions stage. She returned to judge the eleventh and twelfth series of the UK show in 2014 and 2015. Cheryl subsequently served as a judge on the BBC dance competition The Greatest Dancer (2019–2020) and made her stage debut in the West End play 2:22 A Ghost Story in 2023. She is set to return to television in 2027 as a coach for the fifteenth series of the singing reality competition The Voice UK.

Cheryl is a recognised and photographed style icon, frequently referred to as a "fashionista" by the press. She has appeared on the covers of British Vogue, Elle, and Harper's Bazaar, and served as the face of the cosmetics company L'Oréal from 2009 to 2018.

== Early life ==
Cheryl Ann Tweedy was born in Newcastle upon Tyne on 30 June 1983 and grew up on council estates in the suburbs of Walker and Heaton. She is the fourth of Joan Callaghan's five children, and the first of two children with Garry Tweedy, born after the dissolution of Callaghan's previous marriage. Her parents were together for more than a decade but never married; they separated when Cheryl was 11 years old. Cheryl's paternal lineage originates from Tyneside and includes several coal miners and mariners. Her maternal grandmother, Olga Ridley, was one of twin girls born to widower Joseph Ridley and his housekeeper Edith Annie Burton. Joseph Ridley had children from a previous marriage and served in World War I as a Pioneer with the Durham Light Infantry in France.

At the age of seven, Cheryl appeared in a television advertisement for British Gas. Interested in dancing from an early age, she began sequence dancing at four and attended a short holiday course at the Royal Ballet School's Summer School when she was nine. She occasionally performed dance recitals on UK television shows, such as Gimme 5 in 1993.

== Career ==
=== 2002–2009: Popstars: The Rivals and Girls Aloud ===
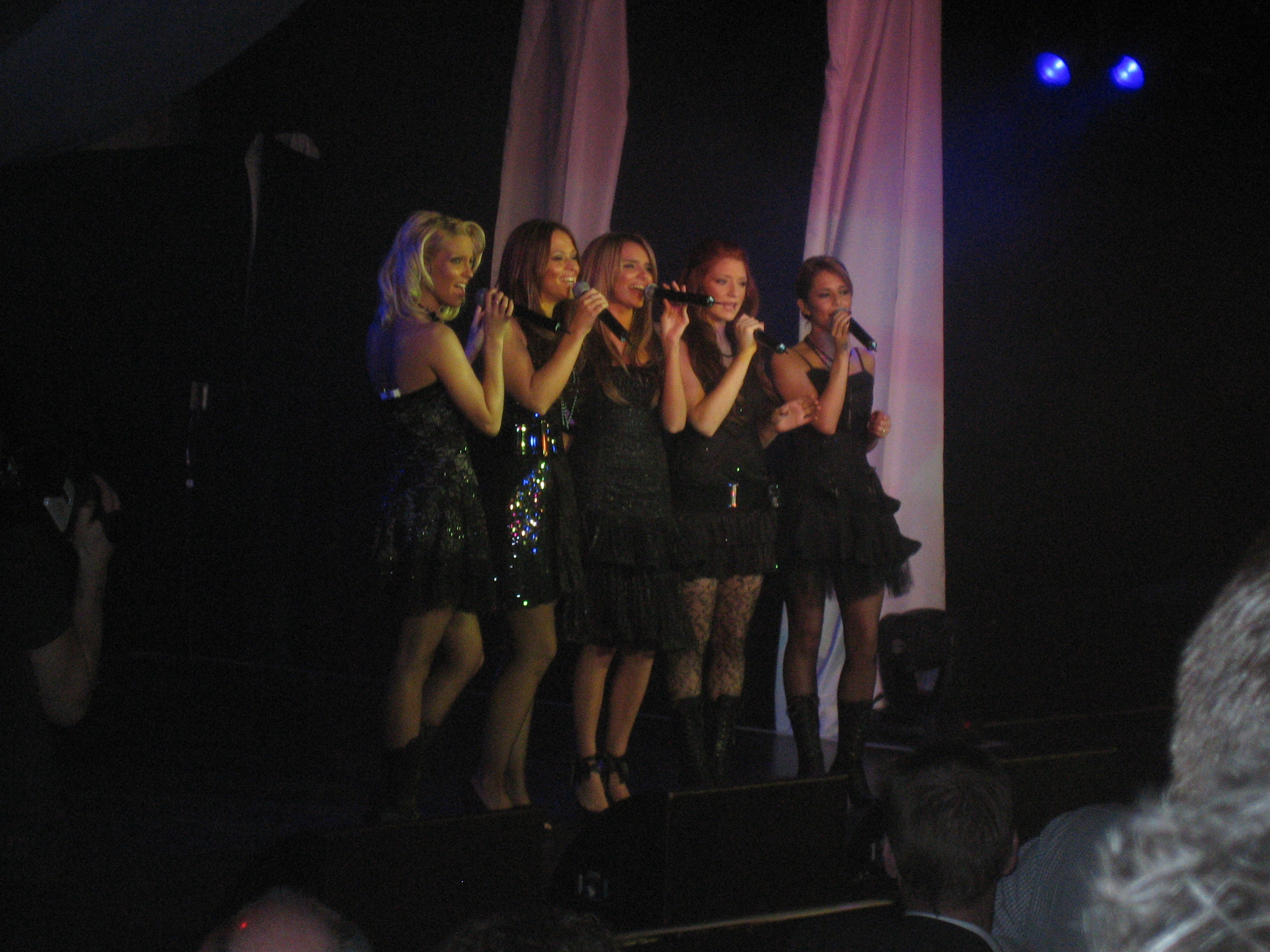
Cheryl (far right) with Girls Aloud performing at the Capital Radio Help a London Child fundraiser, 2005

Cheryl auditioned for the reality television show Popstars: The Rivals in 2002. The programme aimed to create a boy band and a girl group to compete for the Christmas number-one spot on the UK Singles Chart. She sang "Have You Ever" during her audition and was chosen as one of twenty finalists by judges Pete Waterman, Louis Walsh, and Geri Halliwell. The finalists performed live on Saturday evenings, with each week seeing the contestant with the fewest public votes eliminated. Cheryl was in danger of elimination twice, surviving against Emma Beard and Aimee Kearsley in consecutive weeks. On 30 November 2002, she became the first contestant to qualify for the girl group. She was joined by Nadine Coyle, Sarah Harding, Nicola Roberts, and Kimberley Walsh to form Girls Aloud. The group's debut single, "Sound of the Underground", peaked at number one on the UK Singles Chart, securing the 2002 Christmas number-one spot ahead of boy band One True Voice's "Sacred Trust / After You're Gone". Girls Aloud hold the record for the shortest time between formation and achieving a number-one single.

Girls Aloud released their debut album, Sound of the Underground, in May 2003. It entered the charts at number two and was certified platinum by the British Phonographic Industry (BPI) later that year. Their singles "I'll Stand by You", "Walk This Way", and "The Promise" all charted at number one. Their greatest hits album The Sound of Girls Aloud and 2008's Out of Control both debuted at number one on the UK Albums Chart, with the former selling over one million copies. The group achieved seven certified albums, received five Brit Awards nominations, and won Best British Single for "The Promise" in 2009. The group's musical style was primarily pop, though they frequently experimented with electropop and dance-pop. Their extensive collaboration with Brian Higgins and his songwriting and production team Xenomania earned the group critical acclaim due to their innovative approach to mainstream pop.

By May 2010, the group had amassed a fortune of £30 million. Guinness World Records listed them as the "Most Successful Reality TV Group" in both its 2007 and 2011 editions. They also held the record for "Most Consecutive Top Ten Entries in the UK by a Female Group" in the 2008 edition. The group was named the United Kingdom's biggest-selling girl group of the 21st century, with over 4.3 million singles and 4 million albums sold in the UK alone. Girls Aloud took a hiatus in 2009 to pursue solo projects, initially intending to reunite for a new studio album in 2010, though this did not immediately materialise.

=== 2008–2011: Television ventures, 3 Words and Messy Little Raindrops ===
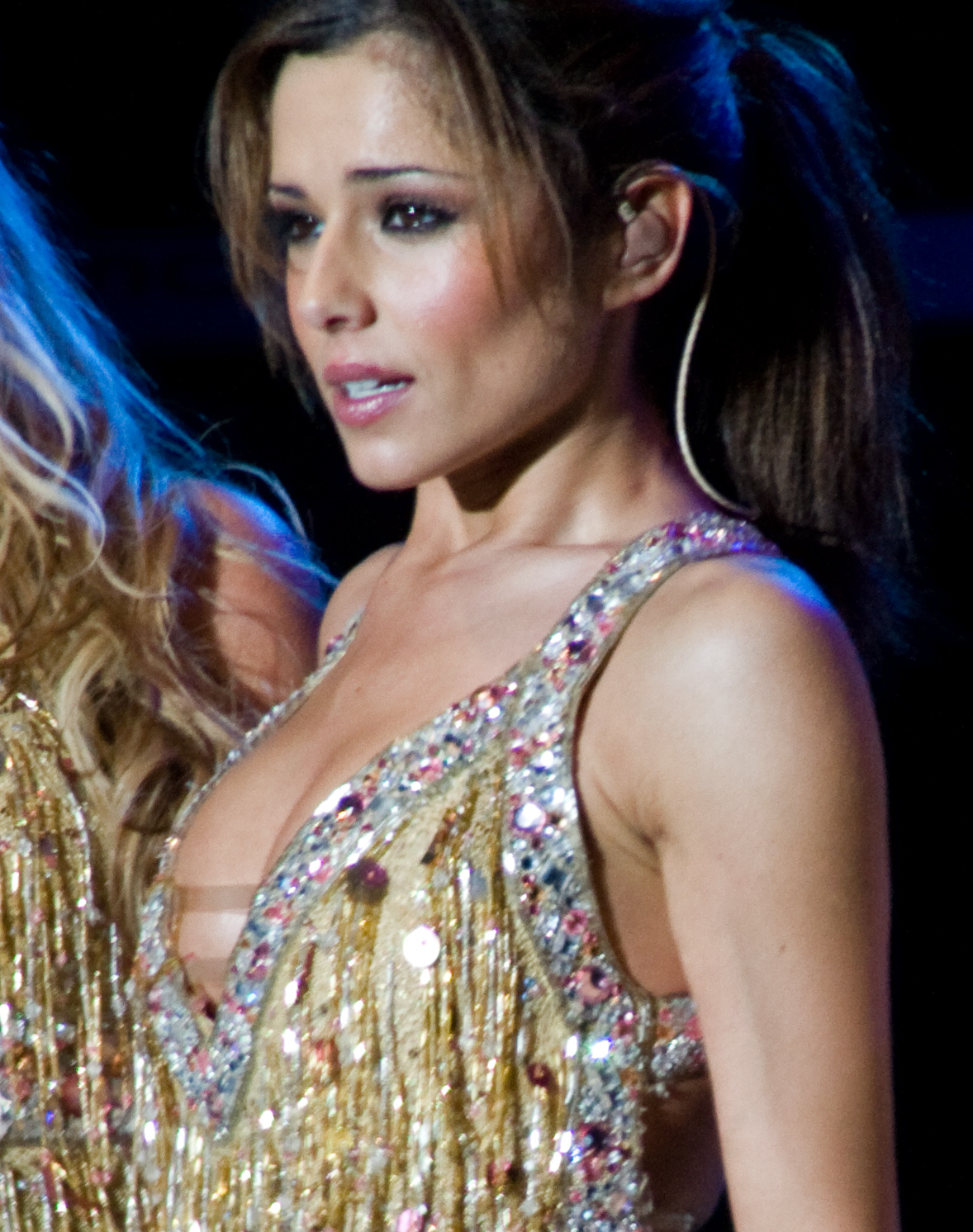
Cheryl during a live performance at Battle Abbey in Hastings, August 2008

In 2008, Cheryl replaced Sharon Osbourne as a judge for the fifth series of The X Factor UK alongside creator Simon Cowell, Dannii Minogue, and Louis Walsh. Mentoring the girls category (female solo contestants aged 16 to 24), she became the winning mentor when Alexandra Burke won the competition on 13 December. She returned for the sixth series in 2009, mentoring the boys category (male solo contestants aged 16 to 24), and won again when Joe McElderry secured the title. Cowell referred to her as "one of the best I've ever worked with." Returning for the seventh series in 2010, she mentored the girls category again. Her act Rebecca Ferguson finished as runner-up to Minogue's contestant Matt Cardle.

In 2011, Cheryl joined Cowell, L.A. Reid, and Paula Abdul on the judging panel for the first season of The X Factor USA. After a three-week stint, she departed the series. Cowell stated she left because he had offered her a return to the UK panel, feeling she would be more comfortable there. Cheryl did not return to the UK show, however, as Tulisa had already taken her place, and Cheryl was unwilling to judge without Cowell present. Nicole Scherzinger replaced her on the American version for the remainder of season one. In December 2012, Cheryl sued the American producers of The X Factor for $2.3 million (£1.4m), having already received $1.8 million (£1.1m) for the 2011 series. She sought $2 million (£1.25m) for the second season plus additional damages. In November 2013, she reached an undisclosed settlement with producers Blue Orbit.

Cheryl made her first solo appearance as a guest vocalist on American rapper will.i.am's "Heartbreaker" in 2008. She was initially cast as a dancer in the video after taking street dancing classes during the filming of the ITV2 series The Passions of Girls Aloud, but will.i.am later asked her to provide additional vocals. In April 2009, she started working on solo material, releasing her debut album, 3 Words, in the UK on 26 October. The album spent two weeks at number one, and the BPI certified it platinum on 6 November; it eventually went triple platinum. The lead single, "Fight for This Love", was written by Andre Merritt, Steve Kipner, and Wayne Wilkins, and produced by Kipner and Wilkins. Following a live performance on The X Factor, the single entered the UK and Irish charts at number one. It went to number one in Denmark, Norway, and Hungary in 2010, was certified platinum in the UK, and became the fourth best-selling single of 2009 in the UK. Her second single, "3 Words" featuring will.i.am, reached number four in the UK and number seven in Ireland. It also charted at number five in Australia, earning a platinum certification. The third single, "Parachute", reached the top five in the UK and Ireland and was certified gold in the UK.

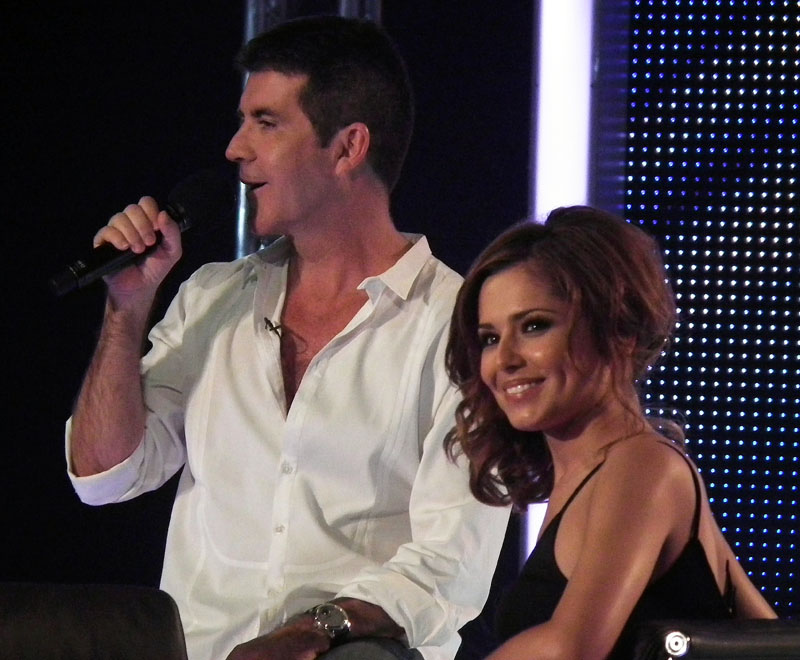
Cheryl alongside Simon Cowell on The X Factor, London, June 2010

Cheryl began recording sessions for her second album in February 2010, later revealing on Alan Carr: Chatty Man that some tracks dated back to the 3 Words sessions. Produced largely by Wayne Wilkins, the album, Messy Little Raindrops, was released on 29 October 2010. Featuring guest vocals from August Rigo, Dizzee Rascal, Travie McCoy, and will.i.am, it debuted at number one in the UK and number two in Ireland. It received mixed critical reviews, highlighted by a positive four-star review from Jon O'Brien of AllMusic. On 19 August 2011, BPI certified it platinum for shipments exceeding 300,000 units. The lead single, "Promise This", an up-tempo dance-pop song written by Wilkins, Priscilla Hamilton, and Christopher Jackson, was released on 24 October 2010. It became her second UK number-one and was certified gold. "The Flood" was released as the second single, peaking at number 18 on the UK Singles Chart.

Cheryl hosted a one-off television special for ITV1, Cheryl Cole's Night In, which aired on 19 December 2009. Hosted by Holly Willoughby, it featured music and interviews with Cheryl and guests including Alexandra Burke, Rihanna, Will Young, Snow Patrol, and will.i.am. The programme attracted 5 million viewers on its debut.

From May to July 2010, Cheryl opened for the Black Eyed Peas on the UK and selected European dates of the E.N.D. World Tour. She also appeared in an episode of the fourth series of Piers Morgan's Life Stories, discussing her marriage and divorce with Ashley Cole and her life-threatening battle with malaria. The broadcast on 23 October 2010 drew 7.2 million viewers, the highest in the show's history.

=== 2012–2013: A Million Lights, Girls Aloud reunion and tours ===
Cheryl's third studio album, A Million Lights, was released on 18 June 2012. It debuted at number two on the UK Albums Chart with 34,934 copies sold in its first week, becoming her first album to miss the top spot and fall short of 100,000 first-week sales. By comparison, 3 Words had sold 125,000 copies, and Messy Little Raindrops sold 105,000 copies in their first weeks. A Million Lights was certified gold in the UK for shipments of 100,000 copies. The lead single, "Call My Name", became Cheryl's third UK number-one with 152,001 digital copies sold. The song became the fastest-selling number-one single of 2012 until December, when X Factor winner James Arthur sold 490,560 copies of his cover of Shontelle's "Impossible". "Call My Name" ultimately sold 417,000 copies in the UK. The second single, "Under the Sun", peaked at number 13, becoming her seventh consecutive solo top-twenty single.

Cheryl supported A Million Lights with her first solo tour, the A Million Lights Tour, running from 3 to 17 October 2012 with 11 dates across Ireland, Scotland, and England. The £350 VIP packages, which included an autograph and backstage photograph, drew criticism from fans due to their high cost.

On 4 June 2012, Cheryl performed a duet with Gary Barlow at the Diamond Jubilee Concert, organised by Barlow to celebrate the Diamond Jubilee of Elizabeth II. She also returned to The X Factor UK in 2012 as a guest advisor at the judges' houses stage. In November 2012, she starred in her own documentary, Cheryl: Access All Areas, which drew 811,000 viewers on ITV2.

Girls Aloud reunited in November 2012 to mark their 10th anniversary, releasing the charity single "Something New" for Children in Need 2012. The single peaked at number two on the UK Singles Chart. Their second greatest hits compilation, Ten, followed on 26 November, featuring the single "Beautiful 'Cause You Love Me". The ITV1 documentary Girls Aloud: Ten Years at the Top attracted 2.3 million viewers in December. Following the conclusion of their Ten: The Hits Tour in March 2013, Girls Aloud announced their permanent split.

=== 2014–2017: Only Human and The X Factor return ===
In June 2014, Cheryl debuted "Crazy Stupid Love" featuring Tinie Tempah, the lead single from her fourth studio album, Only Human. The single reached number one in both the UK and Ireland, selling 118,000 copies in the UK alone. The second single, "I Don't Care", released in November, also debuted at number one in the UK. This made her the first British female artist to achieve five solo UK number-one singles, a record she held until Jess Glynne surpassed her in 2018. Only Human debuted in the top 10 in the UK and Ireland and was certified silver. Its title track was released as the third single but failed to reach the UK top 100.

In 2014, Cheryl signed a £1.5 million contract to return as a judge for the eleventh series of The X Factor UK, replacing Sharon Osbourne. She mentored the girls category, with her final contestant, Lauren Platt, finishing fourth. She returned for the twelfth series in 2015 alongside Cowell, Ora, and Nick Grimshaw. Mentoring the groups category for the first time, her act Reggie 'n' Bollie finished as runners-up. She departed the show in April 2016 to focus on her music career, and was replaced by Osbourne. She later made a guest appearance during the fourteenth series as Cowell's advisor at the judges' houses stage.

=== 2018–present: The Greatest Dancer, standalone singles, stage debut and second Girls Aloud reunion ===
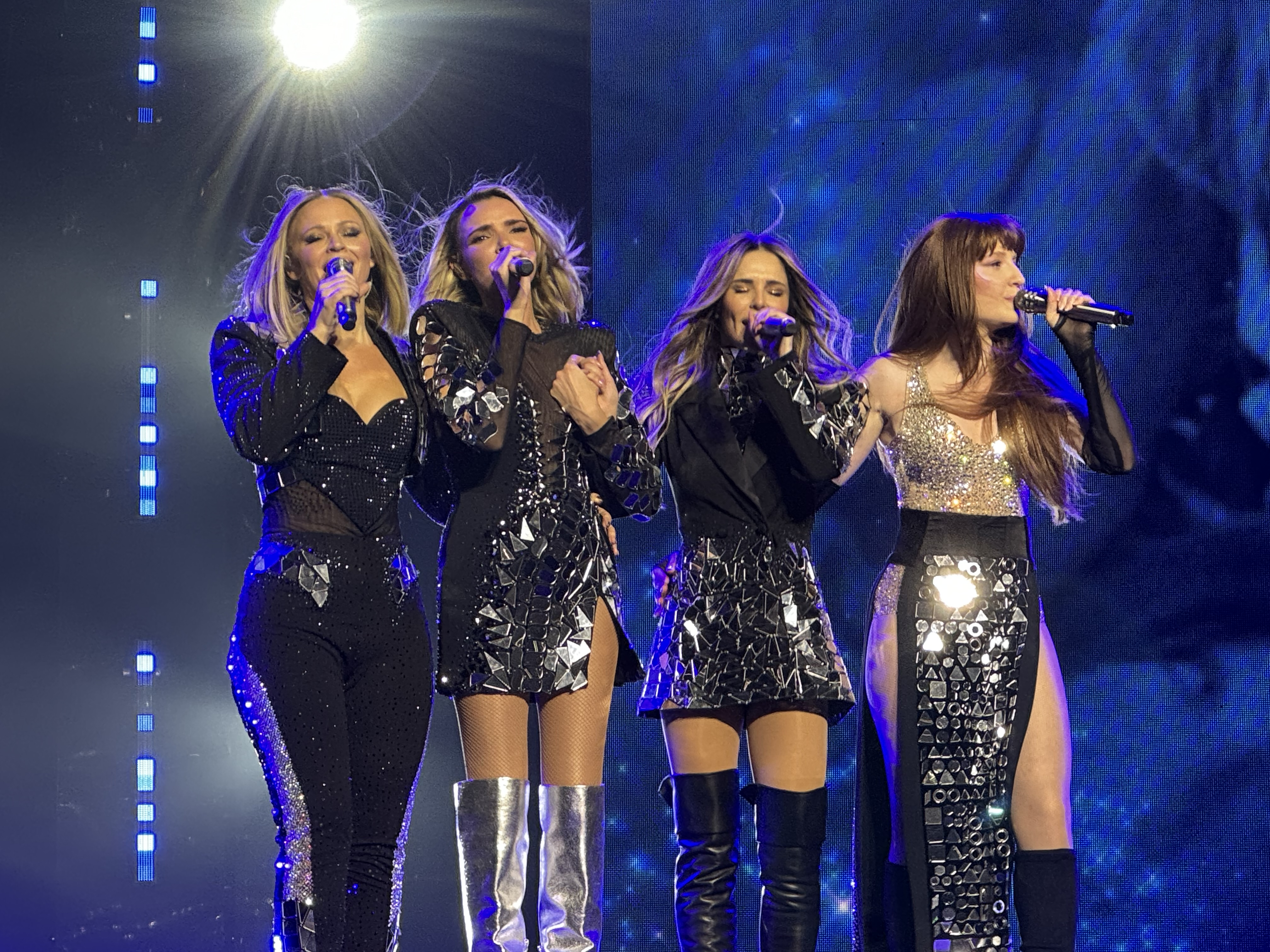
Kimberley Walsh, Nadine Coyle, Cheryl and Nicola Roberts during their The Girls Aloud Show tour in June 2024

In July 2018, Cheryl announced that her fifth studio album was nearly complete, co-written entirely with her former bandmate Nicola Roberts. Later that year, she signed with 3 Beat, announcing plans to release a series of singles before a full-length album. The first, "Love Made Me Do It", was released in November 2018. Her comeback faced intense media scrutiny, and the single peaked at number 19 in the UK and number 32 in Ireland. A live performance of the song on the fifteenth series of The X Factor UK drew widespread criticism, with viewers arguing that its "overtly [sic] sexual nature" was inappropriate for pre-watershed television. The follow-up single, "Let You", released in May 2019, peaked at number 57 in the UK. When asked in 2023 about future music plans, Cheryl replied: "The industry's completely changed and I don't know if I'd fit in."

Cheryl served as a dance captain on the BBC One competition The Greatest Dancer during its two-series run from January 2019 to 2020. She also acted as music manager Coco Rayne in the 2020 Sky Cinema film Four Kids and It. In August 2021, Cheryl launched a 12-part podcast about R&B music, You, Me & R&B with Cheryl, on BBC Sounds. The series drew criticism from commentators who argued that a Black artist should have been given the platform to present a show about Black music.

On 7 December 2022, it was announced that Cheryl would play Jenny in the West End play 2:22 A Ghost Story at the Lyric Theatre from 28 January to 23 April 2023. In 2024, she reunited with the surviving members of Girls Aloud for a UK and Ireland tour, The Girls Aloud Show, celebrating the group's 21st anniversary and honouring their late bandmate Sarah Harding, who died in 2021. In September 2026, ITV announced Cheryl would join the coaching panel of The Voice UK for its fifteenth series, set to air in 2027.

== Other ventures ==
As a member of Girls Aloud, Cheryl collaborated with Eylure to release false eyelashes, with a range of festival-themed lashes launched in 2010, and a limited edition "10th Anniversary" lash released in 2012. Similarly, for their tenth anniversary, each member designed a charm bracelet for Pandora. From 2009 to 2018, Cheryl served as the UK spokesperson for L'Oréal.

Cheryl's first official book, Through My Eyes, was published on 30 September 2010 by Bantam Press. She described the book as "filled with pictures that capture those moments, [her] memories and the people [she's] closest to". Her autobiography, Cheryl: My Story, was published on 11 October 2012, detailing her childhood, rise to fame with Girls Aloud, and her relationships with Simon Cowell and Ashley Cole. It had sold 275,000 copies by February 2013, generating £2.5 million in sales. In August 2014, Cheryl released her debut fragrance, StormFlower. In 2025, she became the UK ambassador for Nivea.

=== Philanthropy ===
In 2004, Girls Aloud released a cover of the Pretenders' "I'll Stand by You" as the official single for the BBC's charity telethon Children in Need. In 2007, the group collaborated with Sugababes on a cover of Aerosmith and Run DMC's "Walk This Way" as the official single for Comic Relief.

In March 2009, Cheryl climbed Mount Kilimanjaro in aid of Comic Relief, alongside Kimberley Walsh, Alesha Dixon, Fearne Cotton, Denise Van Outen, Chris Moyles, Ben Shephard, Ronan Keating, and Gary Barlow. The trek raised £3.5 million for the charity. In February 2011, Cheryl launched her own charitable foundation with The Prince's Trust following a meeting with its president, Charles, Prince of Wales. The Cheryl Cole Foundation provides funds for The Trust in the North East to help disadvantaged young people from Cheryl's home region. On 13 June 2011, she auctioned 20 dresses with ASOS to raise funds for the foundation.

In September 2011, Cheryl became a "Forces' sweetheart" when she visited British soldiers in Afghanistan. In January 2015, she launched a second charity, Cheryl's Trust, aiming to raise £2 million to build a centre to support up to 4,000 disadvantaged young people in Newcastle. To raise funds, Cheryl partnered with Prizeo in March 2015 for a styling session competition and launched a limited-edition Belgian chocolate bar with Greggs in August 2015, with 5p from each sale donated to the trust. In November 2016, she became an ambassador for the charity Childline.

== Artistry and influences ==
Cheryl has a mezzo-soprano range. Speaking about her vocal ability, she said: "I am very aware of my ability, I know I'm no Mariah Carey but I think the emotion in the song is what matters." In a review for 3 Words, Tom Ewing of The Guardian opined, "She's not as full a singer as the belters and divas she presides over each week [on The X Factor], but she's an expressive performer and a less showy backing lets that come through." Her debut 3 Words incorporates elements of dance, disco, and electropop, while Messy Little Raindrops was described as a combination of "anthemic dance and synth-led R&B". A Million Lights also incorporates R&B and dance, including elements of dubstep.

Cheryl has named Britney Spears and Beyoncé as inspirations for both her performances and fashion. Explaining Beyoncé's influence, she said, "I love Beyoncé, I just think she is such a beautiful person inside and out... I just like her as a woman. She's empowering." She also cited Lisa "Left Eye" Lopes of TLC, stating, "I wanted to be [Lopes] – I used to wear baggy jeans and Timberlands like a tomboy." Other cited influences include Rihanna and Mary J. Blige. Cheryl has in turn influenced artists such as Selena Gomez and Jade Thirlwall. The 2006 Lily Allen song "Cheryl Tweedy" was written about her.

In June 2012, Cheryl performed "Call My Name" live on The Voice UK. In response to criticism regarding lip-syncing, she deemed the remarks complimentary, stating, "If you think my live vocal sounds so good it must be mimed, I'm happy."

== Public image ==
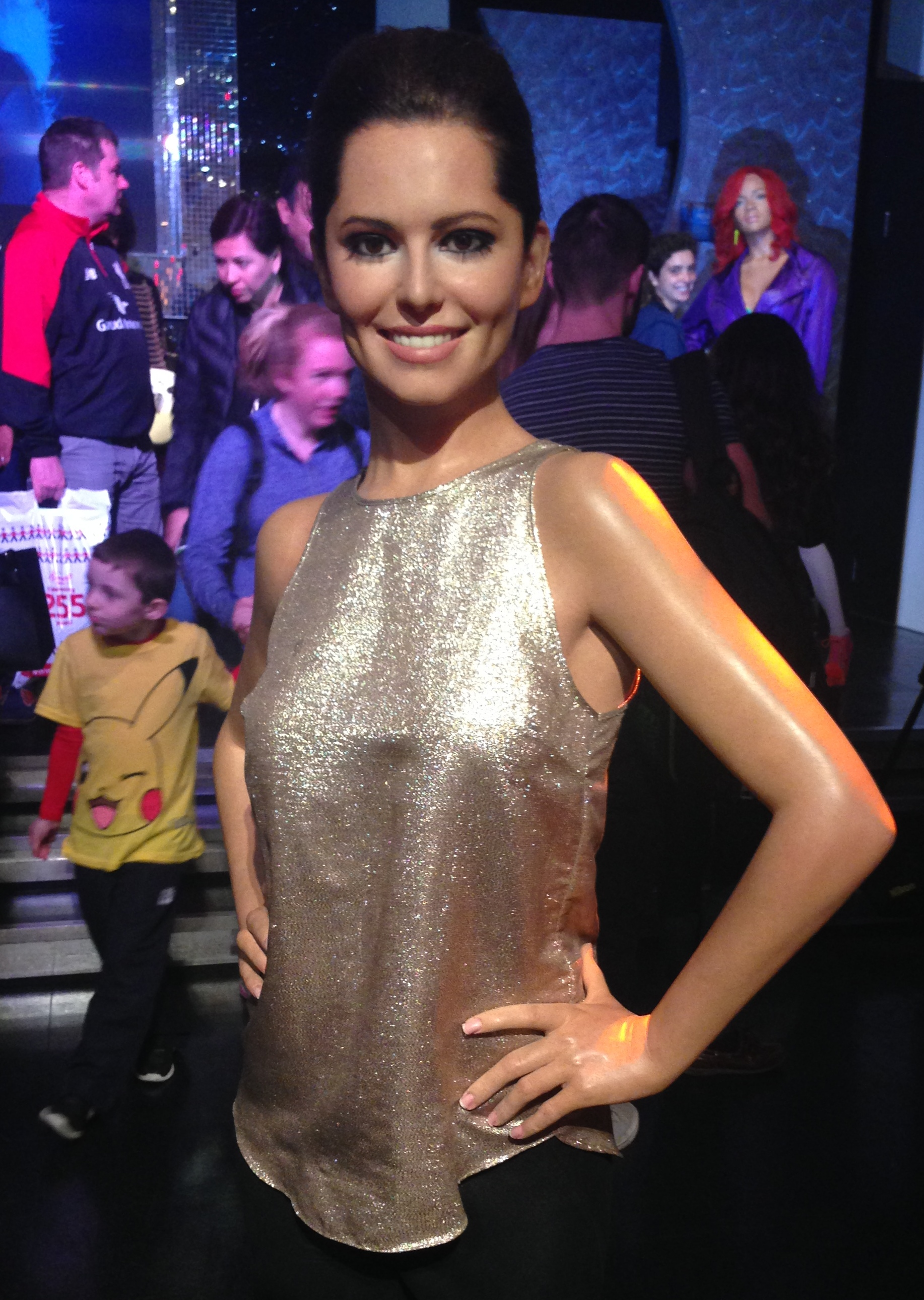
A wax figure of Cheryl at the museum Madame Tussauds in London

Initially recognised as a teen idol with Girls Aloud, Cheryl later spoke of the difficulty transitioning into the industry and feeling like an "object". She noted feeling uncomfortable wearing overly sexy outfits, stating, "it wasn't trying to be sexual. I would never do something I didn't want to do". Her relationship with footballer Ashley Cole drew intense media scrutiny, leading the press to label her a football "WAG", a term she found "derogatory".

Cheryl's popularity grew significantly during her 2008–2011 stint on The X Factor, leading the British press to call her the "nation's sweetheart". As a judge, she was noted for her style, "disarming compassion and sensitivity". The Telegraph's Bryony Gordon dubbed her a "Princess Diana for the X Factor generation." Cheryl has also faced criticism. In 2010, The Guardian's Simon Hattenstone wrote about the public's perception of her: "One day she might be the stoic saint coping with marital adversity... the next she might be the hard-nosed bitch who lip-syncs her way through a 'live' TV performance while her X Factor wannabes have to do it for real, and who is happy to advertise L'Oréal shampoo while wearing hair extensions."

A recognised style icon, Cheryl frequently wore "fashion-forward outfits from Givenchy and Preen, to McQueen and Missoni" during her television appearances. In 2009 and 2010, Glamour magazine named her the best-dressed woman following a poll of 14,000 readers. She has been photographed for the covers of British Vogue, Elle, and Harper's Bazaar. In February 2009, her appearance on the cover of British Vogue boosted the magazine's circulation to 240,000, its highest February figure ever. Cheryl topped FHM's 100 Sexiest Women in the World list in 2009 and 2010. In October 2010, a £150,000 wax statue of her was added to Madame Tussauds in London; it was later removed from public display in August 2019.

== Personal life ==
=== Relationships ===
Cheryl began dating then-Arsenal footballer Ashley Cole in September 2004, and announced their engagement after he proposed in Dubai in June 2005. They married at a ceremony in Chipping Barnet, Hertfordshire, on 15 July 2006, signing an exclusive deal with OK! reportedly worth £1 million for the photo rights. On 23 February 2010, Cheryl announced their separation, and on 26 May, she filed for divorce at the High Court of Justice, citing "unreasonable behaviour" due to Cole's admitted infidelities. She was granted a decree nisi on 3 September. She eventually dropped her married name and began using the mononym Cheryl for her music releases.

On 7 July 2014, Cheryl married French restaurateur Jean-Bernard Fernandez-Versini after a three-month courtship. After their separation, she began dating singer Liam Payne, whom she had first met as a judge when he appeared on The X Factor. She was later granted a decree nisi from Fernandez-Versini on 20 October 2016. On 22 March 2017, she gave birth to her son with Payne. Cheryl and Payne announced they had ended their relationship in July 2018. Following Payne's intestate death in October 2024, Cheryl was named co-administrator of his estate in May of the following year.

=== Assault conviction ===
On 11 January 2003, Cheryl was involved in an altercation with a nightclub toilet attendant, Sophie Amogbokpa, and was subsequently charged with racially aggravated assault. At her trial on 20 October, she was found guilty of assault occasioning actual bodily harm but was cleared of the racially aggravated assault charge. She was sentenced to 120 hours of community service and ordered to pay £500 in compensation to the victim, as well as £3,000 in prosecution costs.

=== Political views ===
Cheryl is a lifelong supporter of the Labour Party. She also publicly proclaimed her support for same-sex marriage in 2012.

== Filmography ==
- St Trinian's (2007)
- What to Expect When You're Expecting (2012)
- Four Kids and It (2020)

== Stage ==
- 2:22 A Ghost Story (2023) at the Lyric Theatre

== Discography ==
- 3 Words (2009)
- Messy Little Raindrops (2010)
- A Million Lights (2012)
- Only Human (2014)

== Tours ==
=== Headlining ===
- A Million Lights Tour (2012)

=== Supporting act ===
- The Black Eyed Peas – The E.N.D. World Tour (2010)

== Awards and nominations ==
Year	Award-giving body	Award	Result
2007	Nickelodeon UK Kids' Choice Awards	Best Female Singer	Nominated
2007	Virgin Media Awards	Most Fanciable Female	Won
2008	Virgin Media Awards	Hottest Female	Nominated
2008	Heat Magazine Awards	Sexiest Female	Won
2008	Heat Magazine Awards	Best Reality TV Judge	Won
2009	Glamour Women of the Year Awards	TV Personality	Won
2009	FHM's 100 Sexiest Women in the World	No. 1 Sexiest Woman in the World	Won
2009	Style Network Awards	Best Dressed Woman	Won
2009	Style Network Awards	Style Icon of the Decade	Won
2009	BBC Switch Live Awards	Switch's Prom Queen	Won
2009	Virgin Media Awards	Hottest Female	Won
2009	Virgin Media Awards	Legend of the Year	Nominated
2009	Glamour Award for Woman of the Year	Best Dressed	Won
2010	4Music Video Honours	Hottest Girl	Won
2010	4Music Video Honours	Magic Love Song ("Parachute")	Won
2010	Brit Awards	British Single ("Fight for This Love")	Nominated
2010	Glamour Women of the Year Awards	Best Dressed	Won
2010	Glamour Women of the Year Awards	Woman of the Year	Won
2010	FHM's 100 Sexiest Women in the World	No. 1 Sexiest Woman in the World	Won
2010	BT Digital Music Awards	Best Female Artist	Won
2010	BT Digital Music Awards	Best Single ("Fight for This Love")	Won
2010	BT Digital Music Awards	Best Video ("Fight for This Love")	Nominated
2011	Brit Awards	British Single ("Parachute")	Nominated
2011	Brit Awards	Best British Female	Nominated
2011	Elle Style Awards	Musician of the Year	Won
2011	NME Awards	Least Stylish	Nominated
2011	NME Awards	Worst Album (Messy Little Raindrops)	Nominated
2011	TRL Awards	Best New Act	Nominated
2011	Cosmopolitan Awards	Best Dressed Woman	Won
2011	BT Digital Music Awards	Best Female Artist	Nominated
2012	Virgin Media TV Awards	Best Judge	Won
2012	BBC Radio 1's Teen Awards	Best British Single	Nominated
2012	BBC Radio 1's Teen Awards	Best British Album	Nominated
2012	BBC Radio 1's Teen Awards	Best British Music Act	Nominated
2012	BBC Radio 1's Teen Awards	Female Hottie	Nominated
2012	UK Music Video Awards	People's Choice ("Call My Name")	Nominated
2013	Nickelodeon UK Kids' Choice Awards	Favourite UK Female Artist	Nominated
2014	FHM's 100 Sexiest Women in the World	Hall of Fame	Won
2014	MTV Europe Music Awards	Best UK & Ireland Act	Nominated
2014	BBC Radio 1's Teen Awards	Best British Solo Act	Nominated
2014	BBC Radio 1's Teen Awards	Best British Single ("Crazy Stupid Love")	Nominated
2015	National Television Awards	TV Judge	Nominated
2018	Digital Spy Reader Awards	Best Singer	Nominated
2019	Global Awards	Best Female	Nominated
2019	Global Awards	Best Pop	Nominated
2020	National Television Awards	TV Judge	Nominated
