= Yungblud discography =

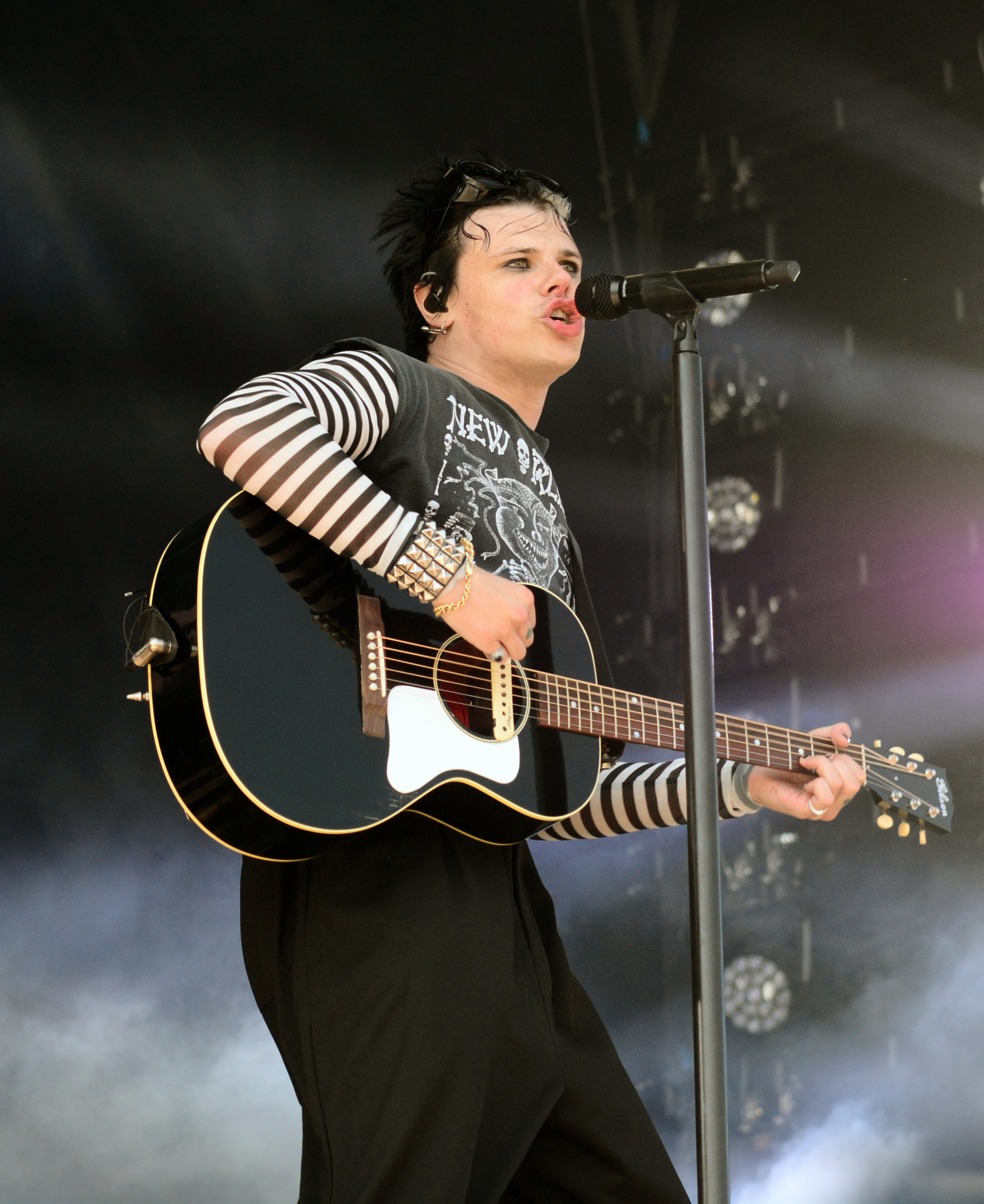
- Yungblud performing in 2023
- Studio albums: 4
- EPs: 8
- Live albums: 1
- Compilation albums: 1
- Singles: 29
- Music videos: 23

English singer Yungblud has released five studio albums, one live album, two compilation album, eight EPs, twenty-nine singles, and twenty-three music videos. His second studio album, Weird!, and his self-titled third album both reached number one on the UK Albums Chart. Weird! is Gold in the United Kingdom.

== Albums ==
=== Studio albums ===
List of studio albums, with selected details, chart positions, sales and certifications
Title	Details	Peak chart positions										Sales	Certifications
Title	Details	UK	AUS	AUT	BEL (FL)	GER	IRE	ITA	NLD	US	US Rock	Sales	Certifications
21st Century Liability	Released: 6 July 2018; Label: Locomotion, Geffen, Interscope; Format: Digital download, streaming, CD, LP	—	97	—	59	—	—	—	168	—	—	UK: 90,009	BPI: Gold
Weird!	Released: 4 December 2020; Label: Locomotion, Geffen, Interscope; Format: Digital download, streaming, CD, CS, LP	1	6	39	26	21	28	80	57	75	10	UK: 107,791	BPI: Gold
Yungblud	Released: 2 September 2022; Label: Locomotion, Geffen; Format: Digital download, streaming, CD, LP	1	1	1	2	3	1	6	2	45	7	UK: 22,825	BPI: Silver
Idols	Released: 20 June 2025; Label: Locomotion, Capitol; Format: Digital download, streaming, CD, CS, LP	1	1	4	1	2	8	19	1	73	14		BPI: Silver
"—" denotes releases that did not chart or were not released in that territory.

=== Live albums ===
List of live albums, with selected details
Title	Details
Yungblud (Live in Atlanta)	Released: 21 March 2019; Label: Locomotion, Geffen; Format: Digital download, CD, LP

=== Compilation albums ===
Title	Details
Beyond Idols	Released: August 16, 2025; Label: Locomotion, Capitol; Format: Digital

== Extended plays ==
List of extended plays, with selected details, chart positions and sales
Title	Details	Peak chart positions									Sales
Title	Details	UK	AUS Dig.	AUT	BEL (FL)	GER	ITA	NLD	US	US Rock	Sales
Yungblud	Released: 19 January 2018; Label: Locomotion, Geffen; Format: Digital download, streaming	—	—	—	—	—	—	—	—	—	
Yungblud (Unplugged)	Released: 10 August 2018; Label: Locomotion, Geffen; Format: Digital download, streaming	—	—	—	—	—	—	—	—	—	
The Underrated Youth	Released: 18 October 2019; Label: Locomotion, Geffen; Format: Digital download, streaming, CD, CS, LP	6	17	37	95	86	63	89	187	31	UK: 43,618
A Weird! AF Halloween	Released: 30 October 2020; Label: Universal Music Group; Format: Digital download, streaming	—	—	—	—	—	—	—	—	—	
A Weird! AF Valentine's Day	Released: 12 February 2021; Label: Universal Music Group; Format: Digital download, streaming	—	—	—	—	—	—	—	—	—	
Hi! Nice to Meet Ya	Released: 7 May 2021; Label: Universal Music Group; Format: Digital download, streaming	—	—	—	—	—	—	—	—	—	
Spotify Singles	Released: 30 June 2021; Label: Universal Music Group; Format: Streaming	—	—	—	—	—	—	—	—	—	
One More Time (with Aerosmith)	Released: 21 November 2025; Label: Capitol; Format: Digital download, streaming, CD, CS, LP	1	—	3	6	11	—	5	9	1	
"—" denotes releases that did not chart or were not released in that territory.

== Singles ==
=== As lead artist ===
List of singles as lead artist, with selected chart positions and certifications, showing year released and album name
Title	Year	Peak chart positions										Certifications	Album
Title	Year	UK	AUS	BEL (FL) Tip	BEL (WA) Tip	CAN	IRE	NZ Hot	US Alt.	US Bub.	US Rock	Certifications	Album
"King Charles"	2017	—	—	—	—	—	—	—	—	—	—		Yungblud
"I Love You, Will You Marry Me"	2017	—	—	16	25	—	—	—	26	—	—		Yungblud
"Tin Pan Boy"	2017	—	—	—	—	—	—	—	—	—	—		Yungblud
"Polygraph Eyes"	2018	—	—	33	36	—	—	—	—	—	—		Yungblud
"Anarchist"	2018	—	—	—	—	—	—	—	—	—	—		Yungblud
"21st Century Liability"	2018	—	—	—	—	—	—	—	—	—	—		21st Century Liability
"Psychotic Kids"	2018	—	—	—	—	—	—	—	—	—	—		21st Century Liability
"California"	2018	—	—	—	—	—	—	—	—	—	—		21st Century Liability
"Medication"	2018	—	—	40	39	—	—	—	—	—	—		21st Century Liability
"Kill Somebody"	2018	—	—	—	—	—	—	—	—	—	—		21st Century Liability
"Loner"	2019	—	—	5	42	—	—	—	—	—	—		Non-album singles
"11 Minutes" (with Halsey featuring Travis Barker)	2019	59	23	2	27	69	41	6	18	1	5	BPI: Silver; ARIA: Platinum; MC: Gold; RIAA: Gold; RMNZ: Gold	Non-album singles
"Parents"	2019	—	—	31	—	—	—	—	—	—	43	BPI: Silver; RIAA: Platinum; RMNZ: Gold	The Underrated Youth
"I Think I'm Okay" (with Machine Gun Kelly and Travis Barker)	2019	90	59	—	22	77	56	14	18	4	3	BPI: Platinum; ARIA: Platinum; MC: Gold; RIAA: 2× Platinum; RMNZ: Platinum	Hotel Diablo
"Hope for the Underrated Youth"	2019	—	—	27	—	—	—	—	—	—	—		The Underrated Youth
"Die a Little"	2019	—	—	—	—	—	—	—	—	—	41		13 Reasons Why: Season 3
"Original Me" (featuring Dan Reynolds)	2019	—	—	—	34	—	—	20	20	—	7		The Underrated Youth
"Tongue Tied" (with Marshmello and Blackbear)	2019	62	—	33	27	—	63	12	—	14	3		Non-album single
"Weird!"	2020	—	—	37	46	—	—	—	—	—	32		Weird!
"Strawberry Lipstick"	2020	—	—	33	—	—	—	—	—	—	—		Weird!
"Lemonade" (with Denzel Curry)	2020	—	—	—	—	—	—	—	—	—	—		A Weird! AF Halloween
"Obey" (with Bring Me the Horizon)	2020	37	99	—	—	—	—	29	—	—	21	BPI: Silver; ARIA: Gold	Post Human: Survival Horror
"God Save Me, but Don't Drown Me Out"	2020	—	—	18	—	—	—	—	—	—	—		Weird!
"Cotton Candy"	2020	98	—	46	42	—	—	—	—	—	—		Weird!
"Mars"	2020	—	—	—	—	—	—	—	—	—	—		Weird!
"Acting Like That" (featuring Machine Gun Kelly and Travis Barker)	2020	—	—	17	—	—	—	14	—	—	16	BPI: Silver	Weird!
"Fleabag"	2021	78	—	—	—	—	—	—	6	—	—		Non-album single
"The Funeral"	2022	80	—	—	—	—	—	40	10	—	—	BPI: Silver	Yungblud
"Memories" (with Willow)	2022	— (Note: "Memories" did not enter the UK Singles Chart but peaked at number 73 on the UK Singles Downloads Chart.)	—	—	—	—	—	—	—	—	—		Yungblud
"Don't Feel Like Feeling Sad Today"	2022	—	—	—	—	—	—	—	—	—	—		Yungblud
"The Emperor"	2022	—	—	—	—	—	—	—	—	—	—		Yungblud
"Tissues" (solo or with Louane)	2022	—	—	—	—	—	—	34	12	—	—		Yungblud
"I'm a Mess" (with Avril Lavigne)	2022	— (Note: "I'm a Mess" did not enter the UK Singles Chart but peaked at number 25 on the UK Singles Downloads Chart and number 28 on the UK Singles Sales.)	—	—	—	— (Note: "I'm a Mess" did not enter the Canadian Hot 100 but peaked at number 34 on the Canadian Digital Song Sales Chart.)	—	39	—	—	42		Love Sux (Deluxe Edition)
"Lowlife"	2023	—	—	—	—	—	—	—	29	—	—		Non-album singles
"Hated"	2023	— (Note: "Hated" did not enter the UK Singles Chart but peaked at number 73 on the UK Singles Downloads Chart.)	—	—	—	—	—	34	—	—	—		Non-album singles
"Happier" (featuring Oli Sykes)	2023	—	—	—	—	—	—	—	—	—	—		Non-album singles
"When We Die (Can We Still Get High?)" (featuring Lil Yachty)	2024	—	—	—	—	—	—	—	—	—	—		Non-album singles
"Abyss"	2024	—	—	—	—	—	—	—	—	—	—		Kaiju No. 8
"I Was Made for Lovin' You"	2024	—	—	—	—	—	—	—	—	—	—		The Fall Guy
"Breakdown"	2024	—	—	—	—	—	—	—	—	—	—		Non-album single
"Hello Heaven, Hello"	2025	—	—	—	—	—	—	—	—	—	—		Idols
"Lovesick Lullaby"	2025	—	—	—	—	—	—	—	23	—	—		Idols
"Zombie"	2025	71	—	—	—	—	—	13	1	— (Note: "Zombie" did not enter the Bubbling Under Hot 100, but peaked at number 21 on the US Digital Songs chart.)	17	BPI: Silver	Idols
"My Only Angel" (with Aerosmith)	2025	— (Note: "My Only Angel" did not enter the UK Singles Chart but peaked at number 9 on the UK Singles Downloads Chart.)	—	—	—	82	—	13	— (Note: "My Only Angel" did not enter the Alternative Airplay chart, but peaked at number 15 on the Rock Airplay chart.)	— (Note: "My Only Angel" did not enter the Bubbling Under Hot 100, but peaked at number 5 on the US Digital Songs chart.)	23		One More Time
"—" denotes releases that did not chart or were not released in that territory.

=== As featured artist ===
List of singles as featured artist, with selected chart positions and certifications, showing year released and album name
Title	Year	Peak chart positions										Certifications	Album
Title	Year	UK	AUS	CAN	DEN	IRE	NLD Tip	NOR	NZ Hot	SWE Heat.	US Bub.	Certifications	Album
"City of Angels" (remix) (24kGoldn featuring Yungblud)	2020	—	—	—	—	—	—	—	—	—	—		Non-album single
"Patience" (KSI featuring Yungblud and Polo G)	2021	3	61	94	37	8	8	37	4	5	5	BPI: Gold	All Over the Place
"—" denotes releases that did not chart or were not released in that territory.

=== Charity singles ===
List of charity singles, with selected chart positions and certifications, showing year released and album name
Title	Year	Peak chart positions						Certifications	Album
Title	Year	UK	BEL (FL) Tip	IRE	NLD Tip	NZ Hot	US Rock	Certifications	Album
"Times Like These" (as part of Live Lounge Allstars)	2020	1	39	64	15	5	12	BPI: Silver	Non-album singles
"Changes" (with Nuno Bettencourt and Frank Bello featuring Adam Wakeman and II)	2025	90	—	—	—	17	42		Non-album singles
"—" denotes releases that did not chart or were not released in that territory.

== Guest appearances ==
Title	Year	Album
"Tell It Like It Is" (as Dominic Harrison)	2016	The Lodge (Music from the TV Series)
"Falling Skies" (featuring Charlotte Lawrence)	2018	13 Reasons Why: Season 2
"Time in a Bottle"	2019	Fast & Furious Presents: Hobbs & Shaw
"Die a Little"	2019	13 Reasons Why: Season 3
"Freak" (Demi Lovato featuring Yungblud)	2022	Holy Fvck

== Music videos ==
Year	Title	Director
2017	"King Charles"	Yungblud
2017	"I Love You, Will You Marry Me"	Yungblud
2017	"Tin Pan Boy"	Yungblud
2018	"Polygraph Eyes"	Yungblud
2018	"Psychotic Kids"	Yungblud
2018	"Medication"	Yungblud
2018	"Falling Skies" (featuring Charlotte Lawrence)	Yungblud
2018	"Kill Somebody"	Yungblud
2018	"California"	Yungblud
2019	"Loner"	Yungblud
2019	"11 Minutes" (with Halsey)	Colin Tilley
2019	"Parents"	Miles & AJ
2019	"I Think I'm Okay" (with Machine Gun Kelly and Travis Barker)	Andrew Sandler
2019	"Hope for the Underrated Youth"	Andrew Sandler
2019	"Original Me" (feat. Dan Reynolds)	Jordan Bahat
2019	"Die a Little"	Andrew Sandler
2019	"Tongue Tied" (with Marshmello and Blackbear)	Christian Breslauer
2020	"Weird!"	Tom Pallant / Yungblud
2020	"Strawberry Lipstick"	Christian Breslauer
2020	"Obey" (with Bring Me the Horizon)	Oliver Sykes
2020	"God Save Me, But Don't Drown Me Out"	Gavin Gottlich / Yungblud
2020	"Cotton Candy"	Tanu Muino
2020	"Mars"	Dominic Harrison
2021	"Acting Like That" (feat. Machine Gun Kelly)	Dominic Harrison, Gavin Gottlich & Ross Anderson
2021	"Fleabag"	Tanu Muino
2022	"The Funeral"	Christian Breslauer
2022	"Memories"	Colin Tilley
2022	"Don't Feel Like Feeling Sad Today"	Tom Pallant
2022	"Tissues"	Charlie Sarsfield
2022	"I'm a Mess" (with Avril Lavigne)	P. Tracy
2023	"Lowlife"	Priya Minhas
2023	"Hated"	Sandeep and Chadrick
2023	"Happier" (with Oliver Sykes)	Masaki Watanabe
2024	"When We Die (Can We Still Get High?)" (featuring Lil Yachty)	Logan Fields & Yussef Haridy
2024	"Breakdown"	Charlie Sarsfield
2025	"Hello Heaven, Hello"	Charlie Sarsfield
2025	"Lovesick Lullaby"	Charlie Sarsfield
2025	"Zombie"	Charlie Sarsfield
2026	"Zombie" (with the Smashing Pumpkins)	Charlie Sarsfield
