= Arrested Youth (musician) =

American singer-songwriter

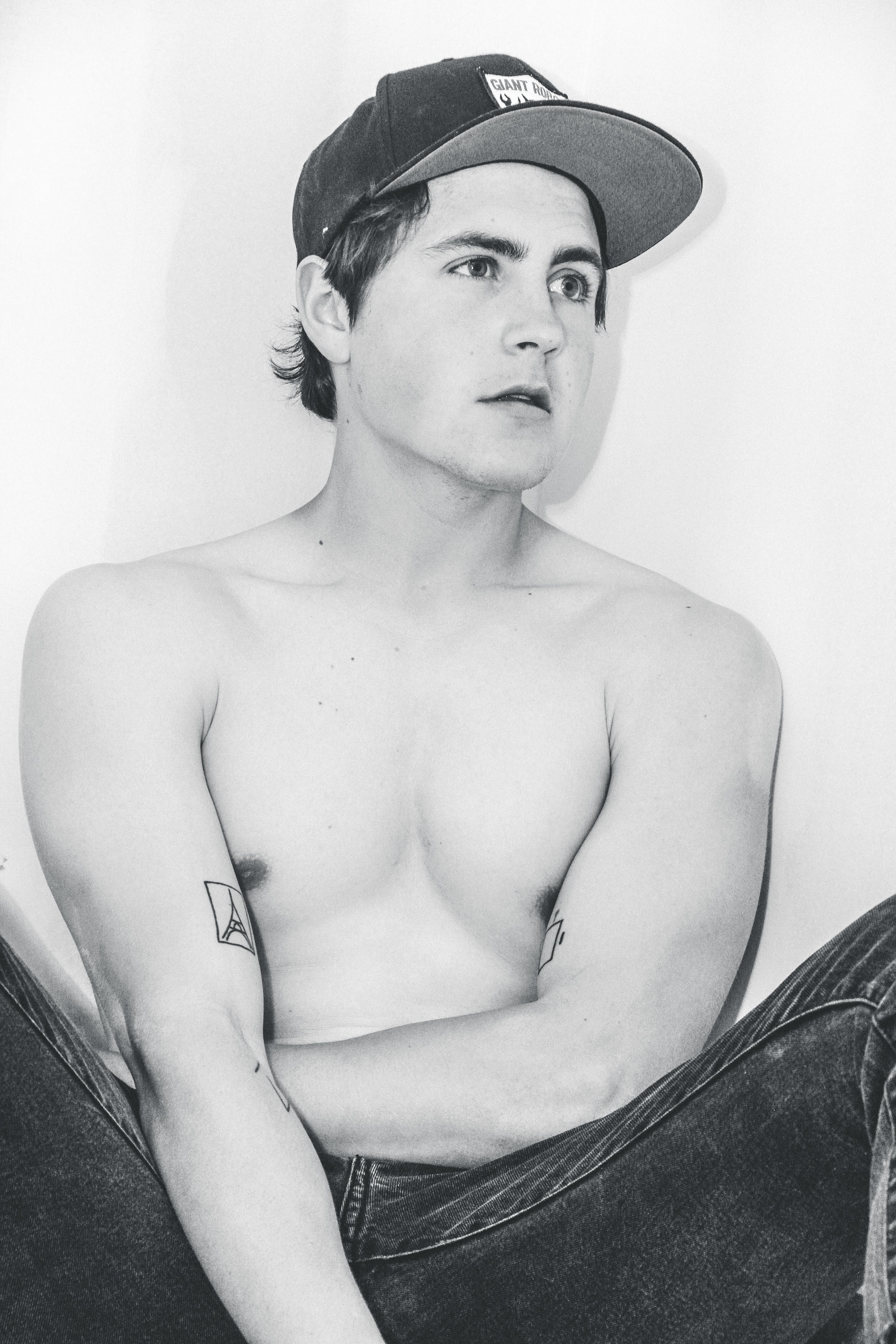
- Arrested Youth in 2026

Background information
- Also known as: Ian Johnson
- Born: Louisville, Kentucky, US
- Origin: Louisville, Kentucky, US
- Genres: Alternative pop; Indie rock; Pop punk
- Occupations: Singer; songwriter
- Instrument: Vocals
- Years active: 2017–present
- Website: arrestedyouth.com

Ian Johnson, known professionally as Arrested Youth, is an American singer-songwriter. He began releasing music in 2017 with independent singles and mixtapes, gaining attention through streaming platforms and live performances, and has since released EPs and albums and toured as a supporting act and independently. He has described his sound as "a hybrid of rock, hip-hop, and pop influence"; his lyrics explore the challenges of modern life and his personal mental health journey.

== Early life and education ==
Johnson was born in Louisville, Kentucky and attended DuPont Manual High School. He began writing song lyrics when he was 15 and released mixtapes and then an EP that charted on the iTunes Top 25. He then attended Indiana University, graduating in 2016 with a triple business major and joined the Global Management Program at Anheuser-Busch, but found he disliked working in a corporate job and decided to return to music.

== Career ==
After quitting his corporate job, Johnson moved to Nyack, New York, near his family, then to Los Angeles. He released his debut single, "My Friends Are Robots", in 2017. He adopted the name Arrested Youth, was the supporting act for the U.S. leg of Yungblud's 21st Century Liability tour in 2018, and released three further singles, his first full-length album, Fear (2018), and an EP titled Sobville (Episode 1). During COVID-19 restrictions, he collaborated with fans in livestream sessions on Instagram and YouTube to create the lyrics for his 2020 EP Arrested Youth & The Quarantiners. Alternative Press premiered the music video for the EP's first collaborative song, "Jumping Ship", which featured video submissions from fans.

Johnson's first full‑length studio album, Nonfiction, was released on June 25, 2021 through Lowly and Big Noise and was produced by John Feldmann. The album included the single "Find My Own Way", featuring Mark Hoppus, made on a Zoom call. Johnson went on a North American headline tour in support of the album and was a support act for Twenty One Pilots on the first half of their Takeover Tour. In 2021 and 2022, Johnson performed further headline shows and also supported Waterparks.

His career was interrupted during the Nonfiction tour when increasing pain led to his being diagnosed with a Chiari malformation. He underwent brain and spinal surgery in late 2021 and suffered blackout migraines during recovery.

His 2024 album, Too Late to Start Over, was recorded in 2023 in Los Angeles with producer Mike Green. Drawing on his health problems, it presents a new, more hope-filled attitude and reflected Johnson's refocusing of his songwriting to be more authentic. The album contains the singles "Little Cup", "Walked Out in the Middle of the Night", and "Free Now".

On December 30, 2025, Johnson released The Sobville Saga, a longer project comprising 18 tracks that explored emotional themes. The album was released through Arrested Youth Records/The Bonnie House and includes the songs "I Cry", "Echo", "Enemy", and "Freedom", which had previously been released as singles or featured on streaming platforms.

== Discography ==
- Fear (2018)
- Sobville (Episode I) (2019)
- Nonfiction (2021)
- Arrested Youth & The Quarantiners (2020)
- Too Late to Start Over (2024)
- The Sobville Saga (2025)

== Tours ==
Headlining

- Nonfiction Tour (2021)

Opening act

- Yungblud – 21st Century Liability Tour (2018)
- Waterparks – A Night Out On Earth Tour (2021)
- Twenty One Pilots – Takeover Tour (2021)
