= Give It Away (Deepest Blue song) =

2004 single by Deepest Blue

Single by Deepest Blue

from the album Late September
- Released: 16 February 2004
- Length: 3:29 (album version); 3:37 (radio edit)
- Label: Data
- Songwriters: Joel Edwards; Matt Schwartz
- Producers: Matt Schwartz; Joel Edwards

Deepest Blue singles chronology
"Deepest Blue" (2003)	"Give It Away" (2004)	"Is It a Sin" (2004)

"Give It Away" is a song by British electronic music group Deepest Blue. It was released on 16 February 2004 as the second single from their debut album, Late September. It gave them their second hit on the UK Singles Chart, peaking at number nine, while being their most successful single on the Scottish Singles Chart, where it peaked at number five and also reached number 36 in Ireland.

== Track listings ==
UK CD single

1. "Give It Away" (radio edit)
2. "Give It Away" (club edit)
3. "Give It Away" (club mix)
4. "Give It Away" (Michael Woods remix)
5. "Give It Away" (Camel Riders Mirage remix)
6. "Give It Away" (enhanced video)

UK 12-inch single

A1. "Give It Away" (club mix)
B1. "Give It Away" (Michael Woods remix)
B2. "Give It Away" (Camel Riders Mirage remix)

Italian 12-inch single

A1. "Give It Away" (club mix)
B1. "Give It Away" (original radio edit)
B2. "Give It Away" (Camel Riders Mirage remix)

== Charts ==
=== Weekly charts ===
Chart (2004)	Peak position
Ireland (IRMA)	36
Ireland Dance (IRMA)	4
Scottish Singles Sales (Official Charts)	5
UK Singles (Official Charts)	9
UK Dance (Official Charts)	6

=== Year-end charts ===
Chart (2004)	Position
UK Singles (OCC)	151
