= Late September =

Studio album by Deepest Blue
- Released: 7 June 2004
- Recorded: 2003–2004
- Genre: Electronic dance music
- Length: 41:35
- Label: Ministry of Sound
- Producers: Matt Schwartz; Joel Edwards

Singles from Late September
- 1. "Deepest Blue" Released: 21 July 2003; 2. "Give It Away" Released: 16 February 2004; 3. "Is It a Sin" Released: 24 May 2004; 4. "Shooting Star" Released: 30 August 2004

Professional ratings
Review scores
Source	Rating
AllMusic	2.5/5 stars

Late September is the only studio album by British electronic music duo Deepest Blue. It was released after two UK top ten singles, "Deepest Blue", "and Give It Away", but did not match the success of the singles, peaking at number 22 on the UK Albums Chart and number 13 on Scottish Albums Chart. It did however go on to sell over 70,000 copies in the United Kingdom and was certified Silver.

This album was also released in several countries around the world, including Mexico where it peaked at number 69 on the Albums chart. It was also released in selected European and Asian countries.

Some editions of the album were released as Limited Edition, including a bonus disc with remixes.

Worldwide, the album's success was limited, going on to sell 300,000 copies, causing the professional split of the band members Matt Schwartz and Joel Edwards after being dropped by Ministry of Sound.

== Track listing ==
=== International Edition ===
1. "Be Still My Heart" - 5:20
2. "Can't Believe" - 4:34
3. "Is It a Sin" - 3:34
4. "Give It Away" - 3:29
5. "Turn Out Right" - 4:29
6. "Shooting Star" - 4:14
7. "Late September" - 5:36
8. "Deepest Blue" - 3:26
9. "Say Goodbye" - 3:00
10. "Spread a Little Love" - 3:53

=== Special Limited Edition ===
CD1

as above

CD2

1. "Deepest Blue" Original Mix - 6:24
2. "Give It Away" Club Mix - 8:17
3. "Is It A Sin?" Cicada Stadium Remix - 4:49
4. "Shooting Star" Smith & Pledger Remix - 7:35
5. "Deepest Blue" Electrique Boutique Vocal Mix - 6:36
6. "Give It Away" Michael Woods Remix - 8:40
7. "Is It A Sin?" Antillas Remix - 8:45
8. "Shooting Star" Full Intention Remix - 8:01
9. "Give It Away" Soulside Remix - 4:45
10. "Shooting Star" Dirty Remix - 5:56

== Credits ==
- All tracks produced by Matt Schwartz & Joel Edwards
- Vocals by Joel Edwards
  All Instruments by Deepest Blue (unless is listed above)
- All Performing & Arrangements by Matt Schwartz
  All Strings Composed by Matt Schwartz
- Assisted by Damon Iddins at The Astoria
- Recorded and Mixed at The Astoria & Destined Studios / Soho Recordings Studios
- Published by Warner/Chappell Music/Windswept Music (London) Ltd.
- Mastered by Bob Ludwig at Gateway Mastering Studios, Portland, United States.
- A&R Direction by Ric Salmon8
- Cover Design by Storm Thorgerson and Peter Curzon
- Photography by Rupert Truman
- Additional Photography by Joshua Richey, Dan Abbott and Bill Thorgerson
  Artwork by Lee Baker and Joshua Richey
- Band Photography by Lorenzo Agius

"Be Still My Heart"
Written by Joel Edwards & Matt Schwartz
Conducted & Arranged by Simon Hale
Violins by Perry Montague-Manso, Patrick Kiernan, Jackie Shave & Gavyn Wright
Viola by Bruce White
Cello by David Daniels

"Can't Believe"
Written by Joel Edwards & Matt Schwartz
Drums by Darrin Mooney

"Is It A Sin?"
Written by Joel Edwards & Matt Schwartz

"Give It Away"
Written by Joel Edwards & Matt Schwartz

"Turn Out Right"
Written by Joel Edwards & Matt Schwartz
Conducted & Arranged by Simon Hale
Violins by Perry Montague-Manso, Patrick Kiernan, Jackie Shave & Gavyn Wright
Viola by Bruce White
Cello by David Daniels

"Shooting Star"
Written by Joel Edwards & Matt Schwartz
Drums by Darrin Mooney
Conducted & Arranged by Simon Hale
Violins by Perry Montague-Manso, Patrick Kiernan, Jackie Shave & Gavyn Wright
Viola by Bruce White
Cello by David Daniels

"Late September"
Written by Joel Edwards, Matt Schwartz & Jason Miles
Conducted & Arranged by Simon Hale
Violins by Perry Montague-Manso, Patrick Kiernan, Jackie Shave & Gavyn Wright
Viola by Bruce White
Cello by David Daniels

"Deepest Blue"
Written by Joel Edwards, Matt Schwartz & Anthony Main

"Say Goodbye"
Written by Joel Edwards & Matt Schwartz

"Spread a Little Love"
Written by Joel Edwards & Matt Schwartz

== Charts and certifications ==
=== Charts ===
Chart (2004)	Peak position
Mexican Albums Chart	69
Scottish Albums Chart	13
UK Albums Chart	22

=== Certifications ===
Region	Certification	Certified units/sales
United Kingdom (BPI)	Silver	60,000^{^}
^{^} Shipments figures based on certification alone.
