= Zombie (Yungblud song) =

- The Smashing Pumpkins remix cover

Single by Yungblud

from the album Idols
- Released: 30 May 2025
- Genre: Pop rock; alternative rock
- Length: 4:06
- Label: Locomotion; Capitol
- Songwriters: Dominic Harrison; Matt Schwartz
- Producer: Matt Schwartz

Yungblud singles chronology
"Lovesick Lullaby" (2025)	"Zombie" (2025)	"Changes" (2025)

Music video
- "Zombie" on YouTube

"Zombie" is a song by English singer-songwriter Yungblud which was released through Locomotion Recordings and Capitol Records on 30 May 2025 as the third single from his fourth studio album, Idols. It was written by Yungblud and Matt Schwartz, and was produced by Schwartz. Lyrically, Yungblud described the track as a ballad about "feeling you're ugly, and learning to battle that". The song features strings from the London Philharmonic Orchestra and a music video starring British actress Florence Pugh.

On 2 January 2026, a new version featuring a collaboration with the Smashing Pumpkins was released. In an interview with NME, Yungblud said that the new version came at his behest, in part due to the impact of the band's Siamese Dream (1993) had on his musical background, and which influenced the original version of "Zombie".

The song received a nomination for the Grammy Award for Best Rock Song at the 68th Annual Grammy Awards.

== Background ==
Yungblud announced his fourth studio album, Idols, part one of a planned double album, on 12 March 2025. The full track list for the project was revealed the same day, with "Zombie" appearing as the fourth track.

The song was debuted on 21 March 2025 alongside fellow Idols singles "Hello Heaven, Hello", "Lovesick Lullaby", and album track "Ghosts" during Yungblud's surprise set at Scala in London. Discussing the genesis of the track, he explained that "the song was written initially about my grandmother going through serious injury and trauma, leading her to become a different person to who she was before. It's about the feeling of deterioration and ugliness; shutting out the world and the people we love out of the fear of becoming a burden or an embarrassment. We all want someone or something to comfort us, no matter how we are right now or who we become in the future. But it's fucking scary."

== Music video ==
The song's official music video was released on 30 May 2025. It was directed by Charlie Sarsfield, his fifth collaboration with Yungblud having previously directed the videos for "Hello Heaven, Hello", "Lovesick Lullaby", the non-album single "Breakdown" and the 2022 single "Tissues", produced by Untold Studios, and stars Oscar-nominated actress Florence Pugh. Discussing the decision to cast Pugh, Yungblud spoke of his admiration for her, referring to her as "one of the most exciting British artists in a long time", and someone who is "completely legit and individual within her own style in her own time." He always envisioned having someone like Pugh as the visual lead for the song's video when he originally wrote "Zombie", explaining that "the song is so deep, so emotional, but so fundamentally British. I was like mind blown watching her on set. And she's just a legend. You can tell, man. She's just sat in a pub on a Sunday with a pint of Guinness, just talking shit." In an Instagram post following the video's release, Pugh reciprocated his admiration, stating "I believe in everything @yungblud stands for and am absolutely inspired by how he uses his art and his voice. Being a part of his music video for 'Zombie' feels surreal to me. Dom and I have been trying to find something to work together on for a while and so when he voicenotes me (in a suuuper casual way) about whether I'd be down we muscled our teams together to find a way to squeeze this in to both our insanely busy schedules, there was no way I was missing out on this. I haven't known him for long but I'm just so proud of this beautiful British talent. Thank you for having me on your journey and thank you for making this love letter to nurses all around. What a privilege it is to make epic things, with epic people for great reasons."

Described by Yungblud as a "love letter to nurses", the video features Pugh as a National Health Service nurse who is emotionally pushed to the brink as she cares for patients and struggles to cope with the pressures placed under healthcare workers. The video begins with her sat alone in the hospital having a quiet moment before she begins visiting some of her patients: an elderly woman, a young girl, and a mother battling cancer, alongside clips of her at home staring at herself in the mirror crying, sitting in the bath fully clothed, and breaking down after a challenging day. She comforts the boyfriend of a woman brought in by paramedics covered in blood, and embraces the children of her cancer patient when she rings the bell to signify that the disease is in remission. Angel wings are occasionally seen on her back. Scenes of Yungblud and his band performing on the ward are interspersed throughout. At the end of the video, one of her young patients takes her to the vending machine, and strokes the angel wings on the nurse's back.

== Track listings ==
digital single

1. "Zombie"

digital single

1. "Zombie" (acoustic)

7" single (0199957311243)

1. "Zombie" (with The Smashing Pumpkins)
2. "Zombie" (acoustic)

7" single

1. "Zombie" (Recorded at Hansa Studios)
2. "Zombie"

== Personnel ==
Credits adapted from Tidal.

Musicians

- Yungblud – vocals, composition, lyrics, guitar
- Sally Herbert – conductor
- London Philharmonic Orchestra – strings
- Matt Schwartz – production, composition, guitar, bass, keyboards, string arrangement, programming
- Ben Sharp – drums

Technical

- Matt Schwartz – engineering
- Mark Stent – mixing
- Ron Tichon – engineering
- Will Borza – engineering, mastering
- Howie Weinberg – engineering, mastering

== Charts ==
=== Weekly charts ===
Weekly chart performance
Chart (2025–2026)	Peak position
Australia Digital Tracks (ARIA)	12
Canada Hot AC (Billboard)	38
Canada Mainstream Rock (Billboard Canada)	1
Canada Modern Rock (Billboard Canada)	29
Czech Republic Airplay (ČNS IFPI)	5
Estonia Airplay (TopHit)	58
German Alternative Singles (GfK)	1
Italy Airplay (FIMI)	75
Italy Rock Airplay (FIMI)	2
New Zealand Hot Singles (RMNZ)	13
Paraguay Anglo Airplay (Monitor Latino)	5
Romania Airplay (TopHit)	200
UK Singles (Official Charts)	71
US Hot Rock & Alternative Songs (Billboard)	17
US Rock & Alternative Airplay (Billboard)	6

=== Monthly charts ===
Monthly chart performance
Chart (2025)	Peak position
Estonia Airplay (TopHit)	68

== Certifications ==
Region	Certification	Certified units/sales
Brazil (Pro-Música Brasil)	Gold	20,000^{‡}
United Kingdom (BPI)	Silver	200,000^{‡}
^{‡} Sales+streaming figures based on certification alone.
