= Just to Exist =

Studio album by All Tvvins
- Released: 12 April 2019
- Genre: Electropop; synth-pop; indietronica
- Length: 35:18
- Label: Faction

All Tvvins chronology
llVV (2016)	Just to Exist (2019)

Singles from Just to Exist
- 1. "Hell of a Party" Released: 2018; 2. "Warm Crush" Released: 2018; 3. "Infinite Swim" Released: 2018; 4. "Build a Bridge" Released: 31 January 2019

Professional ratings
Review scores
Source	Rating
The Irish Times	3/5 stars
The Last Mixed Tape	8/10
Soundblab	8/10

Just to Exist is the second studio album by Irish electronic rock band, All Tvvins. The album was released on 12 April 2019 through Faction Records.

== Track listing ==
All tracks are written by Conor Adams and Lar Kaye.

No.	Title	Length
1.	"Hell of a Party"	3:09
2.	"Build a Bridge"	4:10
3.	"Infinite Swim"	3:57
4.	"No One Is Any Fun" (featuring Sorcha Richardson)	3:20
5.	"Warm Crush"	2:57
6.	"I Heard You"	3:49
7.	"My Future"	2:40
8.	"Just to Exist"	3:50
9.	"In the Dark"	3:53
10.	"Better Than Here"	3:33
Total length:		35:18
