= Shooting Star (Deepest Blue song) =

2004 single by Deepest Blue

Single by Deepest Blue

from the album Late September
- Released: 23 August 2004
- Genre: Soft rock; electronic rock
- Length: 4:14
- Label: Data, Ministry of Sound
- Songwriters: Joel Edwards, Matt Schwartz
- Producer: Matt Schwartz

Deepest Blue singles chronology
"Is It a Sin" (2004)	"Shooting Star" (2004)	"Miracle" (2007)

"Shooting Star" is a song by British electronic group Deepest Blue. It was released on 23 August 2004 as the fourth and final single from their debut album Late September. It was their first single not to make the UK Singles Chart top 40, peaking at number 57. The group were dropped by their record label and decided to split up soon after the release of this single. Despite the commercial failure of the single, it is still used by Sky Sports as incidental music during UK football matches, and was used on Sky Sports News and Soccer Saturday from 2004 until 2007.

== Track listings ==
CD single 1

1. Radio Edit
2. Full Intention Remix
3. Deepest Blue Acoustic Version
4. CD-ROM Video

CD single 2

1. Radio Edit
2. Full Intention Remix

== Production credits ==
- Produced by Matt Schwartz
- Written by Joel Edwards & Matt Schwartz
- Drums by Darrin Mooney
- Conducted & arranged by Simon Hale
- Violins by Perry Montague-Manso, Patrick Kiernan, Jackie Shave & Gavyn Wright
- Viola by Bruce White
- Cello by David Daniels

== Charts ==
Chart (2004)	Peak position
Scotland Singles (OCC)	48
UK Singles (OCC)	57
