= Cotton Candy (Yungblud song) =

Single by Yungblud

from the album Weird!
- Released: 9 October 2020
- Recorded: 2019–2020
- Genre: Pop-rock
- Length: 2:47
- Label: Locomotion; Interscope
- Songwriters: Zakk Cervini; Christopher Greatti; Dominic Harrison; Julia Michaels; Justin Tranter
- Producers: Cervini; Omer Fedi; Greatti; Harrison

Yungblud singles chronology
"God Save Me, but Don't Drown Me Out" (2020)	"Cotton Candy" (2020)	"Mars" (2020)

Music video
- "Cotton Candy" on YouTube

"Cotton Candy" is a song by English singer-songwriter and musician Yungblud. It was released on 9 October 2020, as the fourth single from his second studio album, Weird!, which came out two months later on 4 December. The song was written by Yungblud and his co-writers Zakk Cervini and Christopher Greatti alongside American singer Julia Michaels and songwriter Justin Tranter and was produced by Yungblud, Cervini, Greatti and Omer Fedi.

== Composition ==
Yungblud said "Cotton Candy" was inspired by Katy Perry's singles "California Gurls" (2010) and "I Kissed a Girl" (2008).

Lyrically, the song is a celebration of sexual liberation and finding yourself in others. In an interview with NME, Yungblud explained, “to me sex and sexuality is about freedom and the idea that you can to lose yourself in other people of all genders, of all shapes and sizes to find yourself and figure out who you truly are. Sexual interaction should not be shamed, it should be celebrated because to have safe sex is to spread love and the world needs love more than ever right now. This song is so important to me because I see and speak to my fan base, facing insecurities around sexual interaction and I want to let them know that it is ok to be exactly who they are and have the right to unconditionally love who they want and be loved in return.”

== Music video ==
A lyric video for the song was released on 8 October 2020.

The official video for "Cotton Candy" was filmed in Ukraine and released on 15 October 2020 and was directed by Tanu Muino. It features Yungblud hosting an adult slumber party where he finds himself at the center of a make-out session with an ever-growing number of participants. Leaving the bedroom, he changes into a white women's tennis outfit complete with a silver crown and wings before performing alongside his band as people start dancing around them. He then teleports into a volcano-themed room wearing a leopard-print hat, crop top, jacket and trousers and dances with three women wearing silver costumes and rides a man wearing a muzzle and saddle. Scenes of Yungblud lying shirtless on a bed surrounded by scantily-clad individuals are interspersed with clips of him and his dancers gorging on cake. The camera zooms back to reveal the set of the music video where–Yungblud's photographer–Tom Pallant, acting as a director is shouting instructions through a megaphone before being distracted by a woman in a wedding dress who he begins to make out with.

On 30 October 2020, Yungblud released a stripped back "LIVE AF" version of the track with an accompanying music video featuring Yungblud staring at himself in a mirror wearing a white shirt, black trousers, pink socks, dress shoes and a studded leather suspenders. He walks over to a "Freak Show" studios (referencing the last song on ‘Weird!’) where his band are waiting and dances around the room, he plays the piano at one point while performing the song.

On 4 November 2020, a third video for the song was released titled "the morning after" version. A follow-up to the original video, it features Yungblud sat on the floor of an empty warehouse performing the song acoustically on guitar dressed as cupid.

== Live performances ==
Yungblud performed the song live on the 2020 MTV Europe Music Awards, which aired on 8 November 2020. Filmed at the Roundhouse in London, Yungblud used wires to fly around the venue shooting virtual arrows while dressed in the women's tennis outfit from the "Cotton Candy" music video. Once he had arrived on the stage, he tore off his skirt to reveal union jack shorts before launching into a performance of "Strawberry Lipstick".

He performed the song at the Virgin Atlantic Attitude Awards 2020, which aired 1 December 2020. He also performed the song on the Top of the Pops New Year's special which aired on 31 December 2020.

On 8 January 2021, he performed the song on The Graham Norton Show.

== Reception ==
"Cotton Candy" received positive reviews from critics. Kit O'Callaghan from FlyLive praised the "catchy", "upbeat", "feel-good" song and commended Yungblud's ability to "dip into a variety of different genres", concluding that "Yungblud shows his talent and originality with Cotton Candy and the positive message that the song conveys is exactly what the world needs right now". While applauding the song's message, O'Callaghan noted that the song "lacks the depth and artistic flare of some of [Yungblud's] other songs" such as "Parents" and "Strawberry Lipstick". Conversely, a reviewer for MusicMusings stated that the song "definitely has some depth and a catchy chorus" but noted how "there is a mixture of something quite deep in the lyrics, combined with sections that are shallower and throwaway". They declared "Cotton Candy as "one of the most memorable and wonderful songs from Weird!" and praised Yungblud's "strong" vocals that "manage to marry Pop and Rock without seeming too diluted or lacking in potency".

== Charts ==
Chart (2020)	Peak position
Belgium (Ultratip Bubbling Under Flanders)	46
Belgium (Ultratip Bubbling Under Wallonia)	42
UK Singles (Official Charts)	98
