= LlVV =

llVV

Studio album by All Tvvins
- Released: 12 August 2016
- Genre: Electronic rock, synthpop, electropop, indie pop
- Length: 37:00
- Label: Warner Music UK
- Producer: Matt Schwartz

All Tvvins chronology
llVV (2016)	Just to Exist (2019)

Singles from llVV
- 1. "Thank You" Released: May 7, 2014; 2. "Too Young To Live" Released: May 6, 2015; 3. "Darkest Ocean" Released: August 21, 2015; 4. "Unbelievable" Released: February 19, 2016; 5. "These 4 Words" Released: June 14, 2016

Professional ratings
Review scores
Source	Rating
The Irish Times	4/5 stars
The Last Mixed Tape	9/10 stars
There Goes The Fear	(8.5/10)

llVV ("All Tvvins"; the first two characters are lower-case L's) is the debut album by Irish electronic rock band All Tvvins. It was released through Warner Music UK on August 12, 2016.

== Track listing ==
All tracks are written by All Tvvins.

No.	Title	Length
1.	"Book"	3:42
2.	"Thank You"	3:34
3.	"End of the Day"	3:15
4.	"The Call"	3:45
5.	"Too Young To Live"	4:00
6.	"Darkest Ocean"	3:42
7.	"These 4 Words"	3:13
8.	"Too Much Silence"	4:10
9.	"Resurrect Me"	3:54
10.	"Unbelievable"	3:45

== Uses in media ==
- Their single "Darkest Ocean" was featured in the soundtrack of FIFA 16, a video game by EA Sports. It is also used on Saturday Sport, and Sunday Sport on RTÉ Radio.
- Their song, "Thank You" was featured in a Konami's video game, Pro Evolution Soccer 2017, and was re-recorded in Simlish by the band as one of the featured songs in The Sims 4: City Living.
- Their song, "Resurrect Me" is used on the 2020 Sky Sports television advert for the GAA championship.

== Charts ==
Chart (2016)	Peak position
Irish Albums (IRMA)	2
