= Yungblud (album) =

Studio album by Yungblud
- Released: 2 September 2022
- Recorded: 2021
- Studio: Eastcote Studios London, UK
- Genre: Pop rock
- Length: 33:00
- Label: Locomotion; Geffen
- Producer: Chris Greatti; Dylan Brady; Matt Schwartz; Yungblud

Yungblud chronology
Weird! (2020)	Yungblud (2022)	Idols (2025)

Singles from Yungblud
- 1. "The Funeral" Released: 11 March 2022; 2. "Memories" Released: 6 May 2022; 3. "Don't Feel Like Feeling Sad Today" Released: 29 June 2022; 4. "The Emperor" Released: 5 August 2022; 5. "Tissues" Released: 30 August 2022

Yungblud is the third studio album by English musician Yungblud, released on 2 September 2022 by Locomotion and Geffen Records. The lead single for the album, "The Funeral", was released on 11 March 2022, followed by the second single, "Memories" with Willow, on 6 May 2022. Yungblud was announced on 17 May 2022, via an online livestream in which Yungblud received a ribcage tattoo.

== Critical reception ==
Professional ratings
Aggregate scores
Source	Rating
AnyDecentMusic?	6.6/10
Metacritic	69/100
Review scores
Source	Rating
AllMusic	4/5 stars
American Songwriter	3.5/5 stars
Clash	7/10
The Guardian	3/5 stars
The Independent	4/5 stars
Kerrang!	3/5
The Line of Best Fit	6/10
NME	4/5 stars
Pitchfork	4.5/10
Rolling Stone	3.5/5 stars

Yungblud received generally positive reviews from music critics. At Metacritic, which assigns a normalised rating out of 100 to reviews from professional critics, the album has an average score of 69 out of 100, based on twelve reviews, indicating "generally favorable reviews". Aggregator AnyDecentMusic? gave it 6.6 out of 10, based on their assessment of the critical consensus.

== Commercial performance ==
Yungblud debuted at number 1 on the UK Albums Chart with 22,825 units, becoming his second number one album in the country. In the US, the album debuted at number 45 on the Billboard 200 chart with 13,000 album-equivalent units.

== Track listing ==
All tracks are produced by Chris Greatti and Yungblud, except where noted.

Yungblud – Standard edition
No.	Title	Writer(s)	Producer(s)	Length
1.	"The Funeral"	Dominic Harrison; Jordan Gable; Chris Greatti; Jake Torrey	Greatti	3:30
2.	"Tissues"	Harrison; Greatti; Torrey; Paul Meany; Matt Schwartz; Robert Smith	Greatti; Yungblud; Meany; Torrey^{[a]}; Schwartz^{[c]}	3:35
3.	"Memories" (with Willow)	Harrison; Gable; Greatti; Willow Smith; Omer Fedi; Zakk Cervini; Dylan Brady	Greatti; Yungblud; Brady^{[a]}	2:35
4.	"Cruel Kids"	Harrison; Gable; Greatti; Schwartz; Jim Irvin; Adam Warrington; Dan Smith; Gregory Hein; Andrew Wells		2:52
5.	"Mad"	Harrison; Gable; Greatti; Jonas Jeberg; Fedi; John Cunningham; Cervini	Greatti; Yungblud; Cervini; Liam Hall	2:25
6.	"I Cry 2"	Harrison; Gable; Greatti		1:56
7.	"Sweet Heroine"	Harrison; Gable; Greatti		2:31
8.	"Sex Not Violence"	Harrison; Greatti; Caroline Pennell		3:22
9.	"Don't Go"	Harrison; Gable; Greatti; Fedi		2:29
10.	"Don't Feel Like Feeling Sad Today"	Harrison; Gable; Schwartz	Yungblud; Schwartz; Greatti^{[c]}	1:56
11.	"Die For a Night"	Harrison; Gable; Greatti; Torrey		1:32
12.	"The Boy in the Black Dress"	Harrison; Gable; Greatti; Hein; Ido Zmishlany		4:17
Total length:				33:00

Yungblud – Digital edition
No.	Title	Writer(s)	Producer(s)	Length
13.	"The Emperor"	Harrison; Schwartz; Seton Daunt; Ellis Taylor	Harrison; Schwartz; Taylor	2:56
Total length:				35:56

Yungblud – Physical deluxe edition
No.	Title	Writer(s)	Producer(s)	Length
13.	"The Funeral" (acoustic)	Harrison; Gable; Torrey; Greatti	Greatti	3:33
14.	"The Funeral" (Live at The Shrine)	Harrison; Gable; Torrey; Greatti	Greatti	4:01
Total length:				40:34

Yungblud – Japanese edition
No.	Title	Writer(s)	Producer(s)	Length
15.	"Fleabag"	Harrison; Amy Allen; Brian Lee; Wells; Hein	Wells; Greatti^{[a]}; Mike Crossey^{[a]}	2:56
16.	"Fleabag" (acoustic)	Harrison; Allen; Lee; Wells; Hein	Greatti; Wells; Crossey; Schwartz	3:10
Total length:				46:40

Yungblud – Bedroom Sessions
No.	Title	Length
13.	"The Funeral" (Bedroom Acoustic)	3:33
14.	"Memories" (Bedroom Acoustic)	2:50
15.	"Tissues" (Bedroom Acoustic)	4:16
16.	"Cruel Kids" (Bedroom Acoustic)	2:56
17.	"Don't Feel Like Feeling Sad Today" (Bedroom Acoustic)	2:11
18.	"Sweet Heroine" (Bedroom Acoustic)	3:06

Note

- ^{^[c]} indicates a co-producer
- ^{^[a]} indicates an additional producer
- "Fleabag" is stylized in lowercase

== Personnel ==
Musicians

- Yungblud – vocals (all tracks), acoustic guitar (2, 3, 8, 10, 12, 13, 16), electric guitar (2, 10), keyboards (3, 12, 16), Wurlitzer electronic piano (7); bass guitar, drums, programming (16)
- Chris Greatti – bass guitar, electric guitar (all tracks); drums, programming (1); drum programming (3–12), synthesizer (3, 6, 8, 11), acoustic guitar (4–6, 9–11), Mellotron (5, 6, 8), background vocals (8, 10)
- Jake Torrey – bass guitar, drums, electric guitar (2); cymbals (4)
- Paul Meany – drum programming, synthesizer (2)
- Matt Schwartz – synthesizer (2, 10), electric guitar (10)
- Dylan Brady – drum programming (3)
- Willow – vocals (3)
- Omer Fedi – electric guitar (5)
- Nick Mira – percussion (5)
- Jordan Gable – background vocals (10)
- Tom Pallant – background vocals (10)
- Ed Juniper – drums (10)
- Adam Warrington – acoustic guitar (13), electric guitar (14)
- Ben Sharp – drums (14)
- Andrew Wells – bass guitar, drums, guitar, keyboards, percussion, programming (15)

Technical

- Randy Merrill – mastering
- Mike Crossey – mixing (1, 7, 11, 12, 15), engineering (1)
- Mitch McCarthy – mixing, engineering (2, 3, 5, 9, 13)
- Geoff Swan – mixing, engineering (4, 6)
- Mark "Spike" Stent – mixing, engineering (7)
- Lars Stalfors – mixing, engineering (10)
- Owen Charles – mixing, engineering (14)
- Clem Cherry – mixing (16)
- Robin Schmidt – engineering (1)
- Stephen Sesso – additional engineering (1, 8, 12, 13), mixing assistance (8, 12)
- Matt Cahill – additional engineering, mixing assistance (4, 6)
- Niko Battistini – additional engineering, mixing assistance (4, 6)
- Matthew Neighbor – additional engineering, mixing assistance (10)
- Matt Schwartz – co-mixing (16)

== Charts ==
Chart performance for Yungblud
Chart (2022)	Peak position
Australian Albums (ARIA)	1
Austrian Albums (Ö3 Austria)	1
Belgian Albums (Ultratop Flanders)	2
Belgian Albums (Ultratop Wallonia)	5
Dutch Albums (Album Top 100)	2
French Albums (SNEP)	15
German Albums (Offizielle Top 100)	3
Irish Albums (OCC)	1
Italian Albums (FIMI)	6
New Zealand Albums (RMNZ)	1
Polish Albums (ZPAV)	5
Scottish Albums (OCC)	1
Spanish Albums (Promusicae)	5
Swiss Albums (Schweizer Hitparade)	32
UK Albums (OCC)	1
US Billboard 200	45
US Top Rock Albums (Billboard)	7

== Certifications ==
Certifications for Yungblud
Region	Certification	Certified units/sales
United Kingdom (BPI)	Silver	60,000^{‡}
^{‡} Sales+streaming figures based on certification alone.

== See also ==
- List of 2022 albums (July–December)
- List of number-one albums of 2022 (Australia)
- List of number-one albums of 2022 (Ireland)
- List of number-one albums from the 2020s (New Zealand)
- List of number-one albums of 2022 (Scotland)
- List of UK Albums Chart number ones of the 2020s
