= Matt Schwartz =

Israeli-British music producer

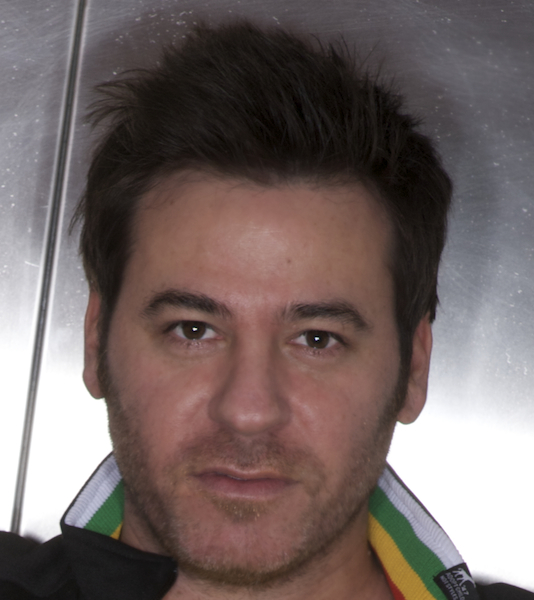
- Schwartz in 2009

Background information
- Also known as: DADA; The Drill; M'Black; Mati Schwartz
- Born: 26 October 1971 (age 55); Haifa, Israel
- Genres: House; electronic; trip hop; pop; rock
- Occupations: Record producer; songwriter; composer; arranger; programmer; audio engineer; DJ
- Years active: 1995–present

Matt Schwartz (Hebrew: מאט שוורץ; born 26 October 1971), also known by his stage name The Drill, is a Grammy Award winning Israeli-British record producer and songwriter.

== Early life ==
Schwartz was born in Haifa, Israel and moved to London in the early 1990s. He attended Kingston University and began working at the Hit-House in Hammersmith in 1994, collaborating with artists such as Farley "Jackmaster" Funk, Dirty Rotten Scoundrels, Matt Jam, and Carl Brown. During this time, he also produced records with James F. Reynolds.

== Career ==
From 1996 to 1998, Schwartz worked at BeatFarm Studios, producing records for Massive Attack, Arthur Baker, Sara J, Tall Paul, and others. In 1998, Schwartz shifted focus to his career as an artist and producer. He founded Destined Records in 2000 for his own releases and co-founded Blackgold Recordings with Gil Goldberg and Muff Winwood.

In 2002, Schwartz teamed up with fellow DJ/singer Joel Edwards to form the group Deepest Blue. The duo released several singles in 2003 and their only full-length album, Late September in 2004.

In 2005, Schwartz performed at the Paris Techno Parade as The Drill. He subsequently has played many gigs under his 'The Drill Sound System' and 'DADA Sound System' and with his Deepest Blue Project. Schwartz has had music featured in films such as The Jackal and The Matrix, and has released music under various aliases, including M'Black, DADA, The Drill, 4tune500, and Deepest Blue. From 2004 to 2007, his composition of Shooting Star was the theme tune for Sky Sports.

In 2009, Schwartz collaborated with Trevor Horn, Olly Murs, Lol Creme, and Robbie Williams. He reached No. 1 on the Billboard Dance Airplay chart in 2010 with M'Black and topped Dutch charts in 2011 with "Bang It All" as Dada & Mastiksoul featuring Akon. In 2012, he co-wrote Kylie Minogue's "Timebomb." His track "Crush" reached No. 1 on the US dance charts in 2013.

In 2014, Schwartz co-wrote and produced Madison Beer's "Unbreakable" and Cheryl Cole's "Only Human." He also contributed to Selah Sue's album Reason and worked with artists such as Union J, Ruen Brothers, Holychild, and Pitbull. In 2015, "Outlines" by Mike Mago featuring Dragonette reached No. 8 on the UK Singles Chart. Schwartz also collaborated with All Tvvins on their debut album and NERVO on Collateral, co-producing tracks including "The Other Boys" featuring Minogue, Jake Shears, and Nile Rodgers, as well as Avicii's "You're Gonna Love Again."

In 2016, Schwartz co-wrote and produced Selah Sue's "Fear Nothing," which won the North Vision Song Contest in Zurich. In 2018, he produced Yungblud's self-titled EP and Peking Duk's "Wasted." Schwartz co-produced Yungblud's The Underrated Youth EP in 2019, which entered the UK charts at No. 6, and also worked on the singles "Loner" and "11 Minutes" featuring Halsey and Travis Barker.

In 2020, Schwartz co-produced and co-wrote Yungblud's second album, Weird!, which topped the UK charts. He produced and co-wrote "Patience" by KSI featuring Yungblud and Polo G in 2021, which reached No. 1 on the UK Big Top 40. In 2022, he worked on Yungblud's third album, including singles "Tissues" and "Don't Feel Like Feeling Sad Today."

In 2025, Schwartz produced, programmed, and mixed YUNGBLUD's live cover of Black Sabbath's "Changes", which was released as a charity single and won the Grammy Award for Best Rock Performance. In the same year, Schwartz was also nominated for Best Rock Song at the 68th Annual Grammy Awards (2026) for co-writing YUNGBLUD's "Zombie". and the album Idols was also nominated for Best Rock Album at the 68th Annual Grammy Awards (2026), on which Schwartz served as the primary producer, producing all standard-edition tracks. In 2027 Matt was nominated for Best Rock Song as a co-writer at the 69th Annual Grammy awards for his song My Only Angel with Aerosmith and YUNGBLUD, the first single of their album, One More Time which topped the UK Charts on the 28th November 2025 as well as topping several Bilboard charts.

== Producer work ==
=== Number one records ===
| Year | Artist | Tracks | Album | Role | UK Chart Position | Club Chart | Other Charts | Certificate |
|---|---|---|---|---|---|---|---|---|
| 1997 | Wamdue Project | "King of My Castle" | | Remixer | No. 1 | No. 1 | | |
| 1998 | Massive Attack | "Dissolved Girl" | Mezzanine | Writer | No. 1 (Album) | No. 1 | | Platinum |
| 2000 | DJ Encore | Album | Intuition | Writer, producer | | | No. 1 Denmark | |
| 2001 | 4tune500 | "Dancing in the Dark" | | Artist/Writer/Producer | | No. 1 | | |
| 2002 | Matt Schwartz | "Can You Feel" | | Artist/ Writer/Producer | No. 42 | No. 1 | | |
| 2002 | M-Gee | "Body Swerve" | | Artist/Writer/Producer | | #1 | | |
| 2003 | Deepest Blue | "Deepest Blue" | Late September | Artist/Writer/Producer | #7 | #1 | | |
| 2004 | Deepest Blue | "Give It Away" | Late September | Artist/Writer/Producer | #8 | #1 | | |
| 2005 | The Drill | "The Drill" | | Artist/Writer/Producer | | | France No. 1 | |
| 2006 | DADA | "Lollipop" | | Artist/Writer/Producer | #18 | #1 | Spain No. 8 | |
| 2008 | Deepest Blue | "Miracle" | | Artist/Writer/Producer | | #1 | | |
| 2009 | DADA | "Stereo Flo" | | Artist/Writer/Producer | | #1 | Russia No. 5 | |
| 2010 | M'Black | "Heartbreak" | | Artist/Writer/Producer | | | Billboard airplay No. 1 | |
| 2010 | Olly Murs | "A Million More Years" | Olly Murs | Writer | No. 1 (Album) | | | 2× Platinum |
| 2011 | DADA & Mastiksoul ft. Akon | "Bang It All" | | Artist/Writer/Producer | | | Holland No. 1 | |
| 2012 | Kylie Minogue | "Timebomb" | | Writer/Producer | #31 | #1 | Billboard airplay No. 1 | |
| 2012 | Conor Maynard featuring Ne-Yo | "Turn Around" | Contrast | Remix/Production | #8 | #1 | | |
| 2014/15 | Mike Mago & Dragonette | Outlines | | Writer / Producer | #8 | #1 upfront club top 40 | #1 UK Indie charts, UK Cool Cuts No. 1 #1 commercial pop top 30 (music week) #4 (midweek charts) | 2xPlatinum |
| 2015 | Cheryl | Only Human | Only Human | Writer / Producer | #7 (Album) | | #1 MTV (16 February 2015) #1 Viva TV | Silver |
| 2015 (Album)/2016 (single) | Selah Sue | Fear Nothing | | Writer/Producer | | | #1 Album Belgium, Luxemburg, Netherlands | Gold (Bel) |
| 2018 | Peking Duk | Wasted | | Writer/Producer | | | #1 Lithuania iTunes | |
| 2019 | Yungblud with Halsey and Travis Barker | 11 Minutes | | Writer/Producer | | | #1 New music Friday UK&AU Spotify | Platinum Aus/Gold US |
| 2020 | YUNGBLUD | Weird! | | Writer/Producer | #1 Album | | #1 UK Official Album Charts | Silver |
| 2021 | KSI featuring YUNGBLUD & Polo G | Patience | | Writer/Producer | #3 | | #1 UK Big Top 40 | |
| 2022 | YUNGBLUD | | YUNGBLUD (Album 3) | Writer/Producer | #1 | | 1. 1 Ireland; 2. 1 Scotland; 3. 1 Australia; 4. 1 Austria; 5. 1 New Zealand | |
| 2025 | YUNGBLUD | | Idols | Writer/Producer/ | #1 | | #1 Australian Albums (ARIA) #1 Belgian Albums (Ultratop) #1 Dutch Albums (Album Top 100) #1 French Rock & Metal Albums (SNEP) #1 Scottish Albums (OCC) #1 UK Albums (OCC) #2 German Albums (Offizielle Top 100) #4 Austrian Albums (Ö3 Austria) | Silver |

=== Other singles / album tracks ===
| 2013 | Bo Bruce | "Save Me" | Before I Sleep | Writer/Production | #10 (Album) |
| 2013 | Lawson | "Love Locked Out" | Chapman Square | Writer/Production | #4 (Album) |
| 2014 | Madison Beer | "Unbreakable" | | Writer/Production | |
| 2014 | Cheryl Cole | "Only Human" | Only Human | Writer/Production | #6 (Album) |
| 2014 | Union J | "Song for you and I" | You Got It All | Writer/Production | |
| 2014 | Kylie Minogue | "Sparks" | Kiss Me Once | Writer/Producer | |
| 2015 | Lawson | "Mountains" | | Writer | |
| 2015 | All Tvvins | "Darkest Ocean" | | Writer/Producer | |
| 2016 | Lawson | "Money" | | Writer | |
| 2016 | Joe and Jake | "You're Not Alone" | | Writer/Producer | |
| 2016 | NCT | "Without You" | | Writer/Production | |
| 2016 | M.O | "Too Good" | | Writer/Production | |
| 2016 | All Tvvins | "LlVV" (Album) | | Production/Writer | #2 Album (Ireland) |
| 2017 | Yungblud | "I Love You, Will You Marry Me" | | Production/Writer | |
| 2018 | BRYN | "Pull Up" | | Production/Writer | |
| 2018 | Yungblud feat. Charlotte Lawrence | "Falling Skies" from 13 Reasons Why Season 2 | 13 Reasons Why - S2 soundtrack | Production/Writer | |
| 2018 | Bullet for My Valentine | "Letting You Go" and "Under Again" | Gravity | Writer | |
| 2018 | Yungblud | "Medication", "Machine Gun (F**k The NRA)", "Psychotic Kids", "Anarchist", "I Love You, Will You Marry Me", "Polygraph Eyes", "Kill Somebody" and "21st Century Liability" | 21st Century Liability | Producer/writer | |
| 2019 | Yungblud | "Braindead!" and "Casual Sabotage" | The Underrated Youth EP | Producer/writer | |
| 2020 | JC Stewart | "I need you to hate me" | | Producer/Writer | |
| 2024 | Jazmin Bean | "Traumatic Livelihood", "Favourite Toy", "Terrified", "Is This It", "You Know What You've Done", "Shit Show", "Stockholm Butterfly", "Charm Bracelet", "The Blood Brings Colour and Fluoresce" | Traumatic Livelihood | Producer/Writer | |
| 2024 | Master Peace | "Lodge", "Panic101", "Start You Up", "I Might Be Fake", "Sick in The Bathroom", "Heaven", and "Happiness is Love" | How To Make A Master Peace | Producer/Writer | |
| 2025 | Yungblud | "Changes" | | Producer | |

=== Selected discography ===
- 1997 Remix 'King of my castle' – Wamdue project Eruption records UK charts No. 1
- 1998 Remix 'South of the border'- (Angels release) Robbie Williams 'EMI'
- 1998 Co-write 'Dissolved Girl' – Massive Attack (featured on The Matrix) Virgin records UK Charts No. 1 album (Mezzanine)
- 1999 Production, co-writer, Instruments – 'A bigger picture' – JTQ Gut Records
- 2000 Artist 'Something about you' – TBC Echo records
- 2001 Production, co-write 'Intuition' – Dj Encore ft. Engelina Universal Scandinavian chart topping act
- 2002 Artist with Jo Mills Dancing in the dark – 4Tune500 Blackgold recordings
- 2002 Matt Schwartz Pres. Sholan – "Can You Feel (What I'm Going Through)"
- 2003 Nova – "All This Love" – Multiply Records
- 2003 Artist With Grant Nelson Bodyswerve – M-Gee Ft. Mica Paris Swing City Club chart No. 1
- 2003 Deepest Blue – "Deepest Blue"
- 2004 Deepest Blue – "Give it Away"
- 2004 Deepest Blue – "Is It A Sin"
- 2004 Deepest Blue – "Shooting Star"
- 2004 Deepest Blue Album- 'Late September' – Open Records, UK Charts No. 22 Silver Certificate
- 2004 Remix 'I Like It {featuring Yvonne John Lewis} Free2Air Recordings UK Charts No. 10
- 2005 'The Drill' – "The Drill"
- 2005 'The Drill' – "One More Night"
- 2006 Matt Schwartz & MJ Cole 'Earthlift' – Matt Schwartz and Matt Cole
- 2007 Dada feat. Sandy Rivera & Trix – "Lollipop"
- 2007 Klark- 'Do Disco'
- 2008 Deepest blue-'Miracle'
- 2008 'Fall Down' – Nicol Destined Records Feat on ABC's show Army Wives
- 2008 'Piano Mano' – The Drill Ft. Firetruck and Antarctica – No 2 Buzz Charts, No 5 Cool Cuts No'1 Download charts
- 2008 'Dancing in the dark 08' – 4tune500 4' buzz no' 1 dj download charts
- 2008 Producer, co-write, Nicol 'how does it feel now'- ABC Drama Army Wives
- 2009 Remixer – Robbie Williams – Bodies
- 2009 Dada, Obernik & Harris – "Stereo Flo"
- 2009 Co-Writer Lol Cream & Robbie Williams – A million more years
- 2010 Producer, co-Writer, Instruments, Mixing – Hyper Crush – 'Flip the Switch' and 'Keep Up' (Mixing, additional instruments co-production)
- 2010 Olly Murs – A million More years
- 2010 M'Black – Heartbreak Destined Records/Robbins Ent., No. 1 Billboard Hot Dance Airplay, No. 2 Airplay (Internet radio), No. 9 Radio airplay (Dance)
- 2011 Dada & Mastiksoul Ft. Akon – 'Bang It All'
- 2011 Dada & Rui Da Silva ft One – Crazy Love (Destined Records)
- 2012 Dada & Mastiksoul – Forever ft. Nani (Manchester United) No. 1 iTunes Portugal
- 2012 Clement Marfo–Mayhem & Champion (Warner) No. 38 UK
- 2012 Kylie Minogue-"Timebomb" (EMI) No. 1 in 10 countries including US & UK iTunes (inc video downloads) top 10 in 23 countries
- 2012 Dada-Metals
- 2012 M'Black – Crush
- 2015 Dada, Paul Harris and Dragonette-Red Heart Black [Spinning/Source]
