= Is It a Sin =

2004 single by Deepest Blue

"Is It a Sin?"

Single by Deepest Blue

from the album Late September
- Released: 24 May 2004
- Length: 3:34
- Label: Data, Open, Ministry of Sound
- Songwriters: Joel Edwards, Matt Schwartz
- Producer: Matt Schwartz

Deepest Blue singles chronology
"Give It Away" (2004)	"Is It a Sin?" (2004)	"Shooting Star" (2004)

"Is It a Sin" is a song by British electronic music group Deepest Blue. It was released on 24 May 2004 as the third single from their debut album, Late September (2004). The song reached number 24 on the UK Singles Chart and number 44 in Ireland.

The track shares a common echoed guitar riff with U2, which can be found prominently in U2's "Where the Streets Have No Name" and other U2 songs.

== Track listings ==
CD1

1. "Is It a Sin" (original mix)
2. "Is It a Sin" (Antillas radio edit)

CD2

1. "Is It a Sin" (album version)
2. "Late September"
3. "Give It Away" (Soulside Remix)
4. "Is It a Sin" (video)

== Charts ==
Chart (2004)	Peak position
Ireland (IRMA)	44
Ireland Dance (IRMA)	3
Scotland Singles (OCC)	15
UK Singles (OCC)	24
UK Dance (OCC)	33
