= Deepest Blue (song) =

2003 single by Deepest Blue

Single by Deepest Blue

from the album Late September
- Released: 21 July 2003
- Length: 3:26
- Label: Data
- Songwriters: Joel Edwards; Matt Schwartz; Anthony Mein
- Producer: Matt Schwartz

Deepest Blue singles chronology
"Deepest Blue" (2003)	"Give It Away" (2004)

"Deepest Blue" is a song by British house music duo Deepest Blue. Released on 21 July 2003 as their debut single, it became a hit, reaching number seven on the UK Singles Chart and experiencing moderate success in Flanders, Ireland, and the Netherlands.

== Background ==
The song was originally written by Joel Edwards and produced by Anthony Mein. After the first version of the song did not gain any interest, it was taken to Matt Schwartz for new production, and he wrote a new backing track and chorus in the studio. Mein did not appear in the final act line-up as he had moved to Thailand and was not in the studio when the record was re-done.

The duo's eponymous song derives its title from a computing accident that occurred when the words 'deepest blue' came up on the screen when Edwards pressed 'save', whilst the content was inspired by Coldplay's "Yellow". In an interview with Zoe Smith for The Guardian, Edwards said, "It's just the first sentiment of Chris Martin's opening line. When he sings, 'Look at the stars/ Look how they shine for you...' I thought that was such an awesome sentiment. Imagine writing that for some love of yours and how heartfelt it sounds."

A new version of the song was released on 10 January 2025, with re-recorded vocals and new production.

== Track listings ==
UK and Australian CD single

1. "Deepest Blue" (radio edit)
2. "Deepest Blue" (Jon Hopkins mix)
3. "Deepest Blue" (original mix)
4. "Deepest Blue" (Electrique Boutique vocal remix)

UK 12-inch single

A1. "Deepest Blue" (original mix)
B1. "Deepest Blue" (Electrique Boutique remix)
B2. "Deepest Blue" (Lee-Cabrera remix)

UK cassette single

1. "Deepest Blue" (radio edit)
2. "Deepest Blue" (original mix)
3. "Deepest Blue" (Electrique Boutique vocal remix)

Dutch CD single

1. "Deepest Blue" (radio edit) – 3:27
2. "Deepest Blue" (Electrique Boutique remix) – 8:41
3. "Deepest Blue" (original mix) – 7:34
4. "Deepest Blue" (Lee Cabrera remix) – 7:42
5. "Deepest Blue" (Jon Hopkins mix) – 3:31

US maxi-CD single

1. "Deepest Blue" (radio edit)
2. "Deepest Blue" (original mix)
3. "Deepest Blue" (Lee Cabrera remix)

US 12-inch single

A1. "Deepest Blue" (original mix) – 7:34
A2. "Deepest Blue" (Lee Cabrera remix) – 7:42
B1. "Deepest Blue" (Electrique Boutique remix)

== Charts ==
=== Weekly charts ===
Chart (2003–2004)	Peak position
Australia (ARIA)	132
Belgium (Ultratop 50 Flanders)	40
Ireland (IRMA)	45
Ireland Dance (IRMA)	6
Netherlands (Dutch Top 40)	18
Netherlands (Single Top 100)	55
Scottish Singles Sales (Official Charts)	9
UK Singles (Official Charts)	7
UK Dance (Official Charts)	5
UK Indie (Official Charts)	33
US Dance Airplay (Billboard)	10

=== Year-end charts ===
Chart (2003)	Position
UK Singles (OCC)	180

Chart (2004)	Position
US Dance Radio Airplay (Billboard)	37

== Release history ==
Region	Date	Format(s)	Label(s)	Ref.
United Kingdom	21 July 2003	12-inch vinyl; CD; cassette	Data	
Australia	29 September 2003	CD	Ministry of Sound	
