= Deepest Blue =

British electronic music duo

- Origin: London, United Kingdom
- Genres: Deep house, progressive house
- Years active: 2002–2005, 2008–2010, 2020–present
- Labels: Data, Destined
- Members: Matt Schwartz; Joel Edwards

Deepest Blue are a British electronic music duo comprising Matt Schwartz and Joel Edwards. They are best known for their UK Top 10 hit singles, "Deepest Blue" (2003) and "Give It Away" (2004).

== History ==
Deepest Blue consists of Joel Edwards and Matt Schwartz. Schwartz had worked with Arthur Baker, Mica Paris, JTQ and Massive Attack prior to Deepest Blue. He collaborated with Massive Attack on their album Mezzanine, helping to co-write "Dissolved Girl" which was used in the 1999 film The Matrix. After being signed to Warner Chappell, fellow producer and singer-songwriter Edwards went on to work with Ed Case, Planet Funk, Chicane, M Factor, Skin and Melanie C.

In a 2004 Guardian interview, Edwards said the name “Deepest Blue” was inspired by a computer accident in which the words appeared after a mistyped command, and that the song’s reflective tone was influenced by Coldplay’s “Yellow.” He also expressed a desire to merge club music with lyrical songwriting rather than produce conventional dance tracks.

After signing with Data/Ministry of Sound, Deepest Blue's first single, "Deepest Blue", was released in 2003. It peaked at No. 7 in the UK Singles Chart, their highest chart entry, and number 5 on the UK Dance Singles Chart. Their second single, "Give It Away", reached No. 9 in the UK chart in early 2004, and No. 2 in the airplay chart. Their third release, "Is It a Sin", reached the Top 30 in May 2004. Their fourth single, "Shooting Star" was released in August 2004 peaked at No. 57 in the UK chart. It was used as the backing music for Sky Sports News between 2004 and 2007. Deepest Blue's only album, Late September, reached No. 22 in the UK Albums Chart, and number 13 in Scotland. The group sold 70,000 albums, earning them a silver disc. Contemporary reviews described the record as a "blend of emotive pop songwriting and polished club production".

After a break to work on alternative projects, Deepest Blue reformed in 2006. They released "Miracle" on Destined Records in 2008. The group split up in 2010.

On 20 May 2020, it was announced on the group's Facebook page that they had reformed with more information to follow. Prior to this announcement, a new version of "Give it Away" with Russian DJs, Filatov & Karas was released on 9 April 2020. On 1 January 2021, a brand new single "Bad Guy" (which samples "Deepest Blue") was released. On 5 July 2021, the group released their latest single, "Rage" with the official video premiering on 6 August 2021.

In April 2024, Deepest Blue announced the release of their latest single, "Reality is Possible" on their Facebook page under their label, "Deepest Blue Music."

In January 2025 they re-released their debut single "Deepest Blue" with re-recorded vocals and remade production.

== Musical style ==
As Deepest Blue’s vocalist and lyricist, Edwards’ delivery has been described as melodic and emotive, set against club-oriented production. Press coverage highlighted his and Schwartz’s effort to bridge pop songwriting with electronic arrangements rather than pursue purely dance-floor tracks.

== Discography ==
=== Studio albums ===
Title	Details	Peak chart positions	
Title	Details	SCO	UK
Late September	Release date: 7 June 2004; Label: Ministry of Sound; Formats: CD	13	22
"—" denotes releases that did not chart

=== Singles ===
Year	Single	Peak chart positions				Album
Year	Single	BEL (Vl)	NED	SCO	UK	Album
2003	"Deepest Blue"	40	55	9	7	Late September
2004	"Give It Away"	—	—	5	9	Late September
2004	"Is It a Sin"	—	—	15	24	Late September
2004	"Shooting Star"	—	—	48	57	Late September
2008	"Miracle"	—	—	—	—	N/A
2021	"Bad Guy"	—	—	—	—	N/A
2021	"Rage"	—	—	—	—	N/A
2024	"Reality is Possible"					N/A
"—" denotes releases that did not chart
