= Heartbreak (M'Black song) =

Single by M'Black
- Released: October 27, 2009
- Recorded: 2009
- Genre: Dance
- Length: 4:08
- Label: Robbins
- Songwriter(s): Matt Schwartz, Nicol
- Producer(s): Matt Schwartz

"Heartbreak" is a 2009 melodic dance single produced, recorded and co-written by British/Israeli musician Matt Schwartz under the guise of M'Black, and features vocals by British/American singer, and co-writer, Nicol (AKA Nicole Dash Jones). This track is Schwartz's first US number-one single on Billboard's Hot Dance Airplay chart, even though he has charted under different guises.

In the United Kingdom, the single was released through iTunes on March 16, 2010 with additional remixes.

== Track listing ==
- CD Maxi-Single
1. "Heartbreak" (M'Black Radio Edit) 3:31
2. "Heartbreak" (Original) 4:08
3. "Heartbreak" (M'Black Extended Mix) 5:46
4. "Heartbreak" (Original Extended Mix) 6:30
5. "Heartbreak" (The Drill Mix) 6:45
6. "Heartbreak" (Eyegate Mix) 7:17
7. "Heartbreak" (Felix Baumgartner Mix) 7:25
8. "Heartbreak" (Inner Smile Mix) 8:37
9. "Heartbreak" (Ron May Mix) 6:55
10. "Heartbreak" (Caged Baby Mix) 8:34
11. "Heartbreak" (Bare Noize Mix) 4:01

== Release history ==
Country	Date	Format	Label
United States	October 27, 2009	Digital download	Robbins Entertainment
United States	March 16, 2010	Digital download (UK remixes)	Robbins Entertainment
United Kingdom	March 16, 2010	Digital download	Destined Records

== Chart performance ==
=== Weekly charts ===
Chart (2010)	Peak position
US Dance/Mix Show Airplay (Billboard)	1

=== Year-end charts ===
Chart (2010)	Position
US Dance/Mix Show Airplay (Billboard)	6
