= 21st Century Liability =

Studio album by Yungblud
- Released: 6 July 2018
- Recorded: 2017–2018
- Length: 35:34
- Labels: Locomotion; Geffen; Interscope
- Producers: Matt Schwartz; Patrick Russel; Sluggo; Martin Terefe

Yungblud chronology
Yungblud (2018)	21st Century Liability (2018)	Yungblud (Unplugged) (2018)

Yungblud studio album chronology
21st Century Liability (2018)	Weird! (2020)

Singles from 21st Century Liability
- 1. "21st Century Liability" Released: 4 May 2018; 2. "Psychotic Kids" Released: 25 May 2018; 3. "California" Released: 15 June 2018; 4. "Medication" Released: 3 July 2018; 5. "Kill Somebody" Released: 23 October 2018

Professional ratings
Review scores
Source	Rating
The Independent	3/5 stars
Kerrang!	4/5 stars
Musikexpress	3.5/6 stars

21st Century Liability is the debut studio album by English singer Yungblud. It was released on 6 July 2018 via Locomotion Recordings, Geffen Records and Interscope Records. It features the singles "21st Century Liability", "Psychotic Kids", "California", "Medication", and "Kill Somebody". In 2019, the track "Polygraph Eyes" was voted into Triple J's Hottest 100 of 2018 at No. 99.

== Singles ==
The title track was the first single released from the LP. It was made available on 4 May 2018 and was described by Yungblud himself as "a song for misunderstood youth growing up in a world of anxiety, confusion and fear." "Psychotic Kids", the next single, was released on 25 May 2018. Its official music video, directed by Adam Powell, was released on 11 June 2018. On 15 June 2018 the LP was made available for pre-order and the track "California" was released the same day as an instant grat. "Medication" was premiered on 3 July 2018 on Zane Lowe's Apple Music radio show as the day's "World Record". A music video for the track, also directed by Powell, was premiered via Billboard on 17 July 2018.

== Track listing ==
Credits taken from Qobuz and Apple Music.

21st Century Liability – Standard edition
No.	Title	Writer(s)	Producer(s)	Length
1.	"Eulogy"	Dominic Harrison; Martin Terefe	Terefe	0:30
2.	"Die for the Hype"	Harrison; Dave Katz; Terefe; Patrick Nissley	Terefe; Sluggo; Patrick Russel	3:08
3.	"Doctor Doctor"	Harrison; Katz; Terefe; Nissley	Terefe; Sluggo; Russel	3:11
4.	"Medication"	Harrison; Katz; Nissley	Sluggo; Russel; Schwartz; Terefe	3:11
5.	"Machine Gun (F**k the NRA)"	Harrison; Matt Schwartz	Schwartz	3:13
6.	"Psychotic Kids"	Harrison; Schwartz	Schwartz	2:47
7.	"Anarchist"	Harrison; Schwartz	Schwartz	2:47
8.	"I Love You, Will You Marry Me"	Harrison; Schwartz	Schwartz	2:57
9.	"Polygraph Eyes"	Harrison; Schwartz	Schwartz	3:43
10.	"Kill Somebody"	Harrison; Schwartz; Terefe	Schwartz; Terefe	3:07
11.	"California"	Harrison; Schwartz	Terefe	3:51
12.	"21st Century Liability"	Harrison; Schwartz; Terefe	Schwartz; Terefe	3:09
Total length:				35:34

== Personnel ==
- Dominic Harrison – co-writing, vocals, guitar, bass guitar, electronics (all tracks)
- Matt Schwartz – guitar, bass guitar, keyboards, programming, mixing (4–12)
- Martin Terefe – guitar, bass guitar, keyboard

== Charts ==
=== Weekly charts ===
Chart (2018)	Peak position
Australian Albums (ARIA)	97
Belgian Albums (Ultratop Flanders)	59
Dutch Albums (Album Top 100)	168

=== Year-end charts ===
Chart (2019)	Position
Belgian Albums (Ultratop Flanders)	186

== Certifications ==
Region	Certification	Certified units/sales
United Kingdom (BPI)	Gold	100,000^{‡}
^{‡} Sales+streaming figures based on certification alone.

== Release history ==
List of release dates, showing region, versions, formats, labels, and references
Region	Date	Format(s)	Label	Ref.
Various	6 July 2018	Digital download; streaming	Locomotion; Geffen; Interscope	
Various	13 July 2018	CD	Locomotion; Geffen; Interscope	
Various	7 September 2018	Vinyl	Locomotion; Geffen; Interscope	
