= All Tvvins =

Irish musical group

- Origin: Dublin, Ireland
- Years active: 2014 – present
- Labels: Warner; Dew Process; Faction Records
- Spinoff of: Adebisi Shank, The Cast of Cheers
- Members: Conor Adams; Lar Kaye
- Website: alltvvins.com

All Tvvins are an Irish pop band from Dublin. In 2016, the band released their debut album, llVV, which debuted at number 2 on the Irish charts. In 2019 they released "Just to Exist" under Faction Records label.

Composed of former members of DIY math-rock bands Adebisi Shank and The Cast of Cheers, the new project marks a sharp turn into commercial pop music, signing with Warner Music.

== Discography ==
=== Singles ===
- "Thank You" (2014)
- "Too Young To Live" (2015)
- "Darkest Ocean" (2015)
- "Unbelievable" (2016)
- "These 4 Words" (2016)
- "Book" (2016)
- "Resurrect Me" (2016)
- "Too Much Silence" (2016)
- "End Of The Day" (2016)
- "Alone Together" (2017)
- "Hell Of A Party" (2019)
- "Build A Bridge" (2019)
- "Infinite Swim" (2019)
- "Divine" (2019)
- "Hope It Don't" (2020)
- "Something Special" (2021)

=== Studio albums ===
- llVV (2016)
- Just to Exist (2019)
