= Idols (album) =

Studio album by Yungblud
- Released: 20 June 2025
- Recorded: 2021–2025
- Genre: Rock
- Length: 47:45
- Labels: Locomotion; Capitol
- Producer: Matt Schwartz

Yungblud chronology
Yungblud (2022)	Idols (2025)	One More Time (2025)

Singles from Idols
- 1. "Hello Heaven, Hello" Released: 18 March 2025; 2. "Lovesick Lullaby" Released: 25 April 2025; 3. "Zombie" Released: 30 May 2025

Professional ratings
Aggregate scores
Source	Rating
Metacritic	65/100
Review scores
Source	Rating
AllMusic	3.5/5 stars
The Arts Desk	1/5 stars
The Daily Telegraph	3/5 stars
Dork	4/5
Kerrang!	4/5
The Line of Best Fit	4/10
Rolling Stone	3/5 stars

Idols is the fourth studio album by British musician Yungblud. It was released on 20 June 2025 through Locomotion Recordings and Capitol Records. It was preceded by the singles "Hello Heaven, Hello", "Lovesick Lullaby", and "Zombie".

It was nominated for the Grammy Award for Best Rock Album at the 68th Annual Grammy Awards.

The album received generally positive reviews from major music publication upon its release.

== Background and themes ==
Idols was created over the course of four years in Leeds, a deliberate choice to work close to where Yungblud grew up, and has been called his most ambitious work yet. Yungblud referred to it as "a project with no limitations". The album was issued as a double LP, with the first part released on 20 June 2025. This initial 12-track collection features the singles "Hello Heaven, Hello", "Lovesick Lullaby", and "Zombie".

Harrison referred to the project as "a love letter to self-reclamation... to rock music... [and] to life; in all its fucking madness". Instead of focusing on singles, the creation process for Idols revolved around "feeling and world-building". He intended to challenge the ideas of "identity" by trying to strengthen one's self-worth and looking inward for answers about identity before looking at other people. Another theme he explores on the album is his own masculinity, a thought that he considers "a crazy thing to say in 2025". It marks a shift in his career, drawing influence from Britpop as well as a variety of artists, including Oasis, the Verve, Primal Scream, My Chemical Romance, David Bowie and Madonna.

== Promotion ==
Shortly after the album's announcement, Harrison shared cities for his upcoming North American and European tour from August to October 2025.

== Commercial performance ==
Idols debuted atop the UK Albums Charts selling 25,947 units in its first week.

In the US, the album debuted at number 73 on the Billboard 200 and number 15 on the Top Rock & Alternative Albums charts, selling more than 11,000 pure album sales. As of February 2026, it has sold 126,000 equivalent album units in the United States.

== Track listing ==
All tracks are produced by Matt Schwartz, except where noted.

Idols track listing; Idols (Complete) volume one track listing
No.	Title	Writer(s)	Length
1.	"Hello Heaven, Hello"	Dominic Harrison; Bob Bradley; Matt Schwartz; Adam Warrington	9:06
2.	"Idols Pt. I"	Harrison; Bradley; Schwartz	3:35
3.	"Lovesick Lullaby"	Harrison; Bradley; Schwartz; Warrington	2:55
4.	"Zombie"	Harrison; Schwartz	4:07
5.	"The Greatest Parade"	Harrison; Bradley; Schwartz; Warrington	3:56
6.	"Change"	Harrison; Bradley; Schwartz; Warrington	3:28
7.	"Monday Murder"	Harrison; Schwartz; Warrington	2:55
8.	"Ghosts"	Harrison; Schwartz	6:26
9.	"Fire"	Harrison; Bradley; Schwartz; Warrington	2:33
10.	"War"	Harrison; Schwartz; Martin Terefe	3:51
11.	"Idols Pt. II"	Harrison; Schwartz	1:41
12.	"Supermoon"	Harrison; Schwartz	3:12
Total length:			47:45

Idols – Japanese limited edition
No.	Title	Writer(s)	Producers	Length
13.	"Abyss"	Harrison; Dan Reynolds; Schwartz; Mattias Per Larsson; Robin Lennart Fredriksson	Yungblud; Schwartz	2:04
Total length:				49:49

Idols (Complete) volume two track listing
No.	Title	Writer(s)	Producer(s)	Length
1.	"I Need You (To Make the World Seem Fine)"	Harrison; Schwartz		3:42
2.	"The Postman"	Harrison; Schwartz		2:55
3.	"Zombie" (with the Smashing Pumpkins)	Harrison; Schwartz	Billy Corgan; Schwartz	4:00
4.	"Time"	Harrison; Schwartz		2:15
5.	"War Pt. II"	Harrison; Schwartz; Terefe		3:44
6.	"Blueberry Hill"	Harrison; Schwartz		5:10
7.	"Suburban Requiem"	Harrison; Schwartz		4:40
Total length:				1:14:11

== Personnel ==
Credits adapted from Tidal.

=== Musicians ===
- Dominic Harrison – vocals (all tracks), guitar (tracks 1–10), keyboards (6), piano (11)
- Matt Schwartz – bass, programming (all tracks); keyboards (1–10, 12), guitar (1–10), string arrangement (2, 4–8, 10, 12), strings (4)
- Ben Sharp – drums (1–10, 12)
- Adam Warrington – guitar (1–3, 5–10, 12)
- London Philharmonic Orchestra – strings (1, 2, 4–8, 10)
- Bob Bradley – bass (all tracks), guitar (3, 9)
- Brixton Choir – vocals (1)
- Sally Herbert – conductor (2, 4–8, 10)
- Mary Hammond – choir arrangement (12)
- Cormac Diamond, Ela Vaughan, Zach Burns, Hannah Walker, Joe Partridge, Madeleine Morgan - Choir (12)

=== Technical ===
- Matt Schwartz – production, engineering (all tracks); mixing (2, 5, 6, 11, 12)
- Bob Bradley – additional production (2, 3, 5–7, 9), (1–3, 5–10)
- Rich Costey – mixing (1, 3, 5, 9)
- Mark "Spike" Stent – mixing (4, 10)
- Howie Weinberg – mastering
- Will Borza – mastering
- Ron Tichon – engineering (1–10, 12)
- Gianluca Massimo – string engineering (1, 2, 4–8, 10)

== Charts ==
=== Weekly charts ===
Weekly chart performance for Idols
Chart (2025–2026)	Peak position
Australian Albums (ARIA)	1
Australian Albums (ARIA) Idols (Complete)	27
Australian Albums (ARIA) Idols II	44
Austrian Albums (Ö3 Austria)	4
Belgian Albums (Ultratop Flanders)	1
Belgian Albums (Ultratop Wallonia)	6
Croatian International Albums (HDU)	34
Czech Albums (ČNS IFPI)	77
Dutch Albums (Album Top 100)	1
French Albums (SNEP)	24
French Albums (SNEP) Idols II	142
French Rock & Metal Albums (SNEP)	1
German Albums (Offizielle Top 100)	2
German Rock & Metal Albums (Offizielle Top 100) Idols II	18
Irish Albums (Official Charts)	8
Italian Albums (FIMI)	19
Japanese Western Albums (Oricon)	30
New Zealand Albums (RMNZ)	12
Polish Albums (ZPAV)	18
Scottish Albums (Official Charts)	1
Spanish Albums (PROMUSICAE)	81
Swiss Albums (Schweizer Hitparade)	13
UK Albums (Official Charts)	1
US Billboard 200	73
US Top Rock & Alternative Albums (Billboard)	15

=== Year-end charts ===
Year-end chart performance for Idols
Chart (2025)	Position
Belgian Albums (Ultratop Flanders)	98

== Certifications ==
Certifications for Idols
Region	Certification	Certified units/sales
United Kingdom (BPI)	Silver	60,000^{‡}
^{‡} Sales+streaming figures based on certification alone.
