= Weird! =

Studio album by Yungblud
- Released: 4 December 2020
- Recorded: 2019–2020
- Genre: Indie rock; pop-punk
- Length: 45:01
- Label: Locomotion; Interscope
- Producer: Yungblud; Zakk Cervini; Chris Greatti; Omer Fedi; Mike Crossey; Matt Schwartz

Yungblud chronology
A Weird! AF Halloween (2020)	Weird! (2020)	Yungblud (2022)

Yungblud studio album chronology
21st Century Liability (2018)	Weird! (2020)	Yungblud (2022)

Singles from Weird!
- 1. "Weird!" Released: 22 April 2020; 2. "Strawberry Lipstick" Released: 16 July 2020; 3. "God Save Me, but Don't Drown Me Out" Released: 17 September 2020; 4. "Cotton Candy" Released: 9 October 2020; 5. "Mars" Released: 27 November 2020; 6. "Acting Like That" Released: 2 December 2020

Weird! is the second studio album by English singer Yungblud, released on 4 December 2020 by Locomotion and Interscope Records. Originally scheduled for 13 November 2020, the album's release was delayed due to the COVID-19 pandemic. It is Yungblud's first album since 21st Century Liability (2018). The album was supported by six singles: "Weird!", "Strawberry Lipstick", "God Save Me, but Don't Drown Me Out", "Cotton Candy", "Mars" and "Acting Like That". The album also contains collaborations with Machine Gun Kelly and Travis Barker.

Weird! debuted at number 1 on the UK Albums Chart selling 39,000 units in its first week.

== Background ==
On 2 December 2019, Yungblud shared on social media that he was going "a little mia" to work on his second record. The next day, he clarified that he was not taking time off, just taking time to finish the second album. On 3 December, Matt Schwartz posted photos of himself and Harrison on his Instagram, with the caption stating that they were working on the second studio album in Spain.

Throughout the process of making the album, he would occasionally tweet out pieces of poems that appeared to be lyrics to songs. In May 2020, during an NME interview he was asked about the album, replying: "The album is done and we're going to start rolling it out. [Weird!] is the first chess move of that era. There's a lot of diversity on [the album] – it's like an episode of Skins in an album. Since the beginning of time, humans have been so complex and like 15 different personalities at once – but we're the first generation to accept it and know that it's alright to be who you are." The cover is made to imitate the film poster for This Is England.

== Critical reception ==
Professional ratings
Aggregate scores
Source	Rating
AnyDecentMusic?	5.9/10
Metacritic	66/100
Review scores
Source	Rating
AllMusic	3.5/5 stars
The Arts Desk	2/5 stars
Clash	7/10
Dork	5/5 stars
Evening Standard	2/5 stars
The Guardian	2/5 stars
The Independent	4/5 stars
Kerrang!	2/5
NME	5/5 stars
Pitchfork	5.5/10

Weird! received mixed reviews from music critics. At Metacritic, which assigns a normalised rating out of 100 to reviews from professional critics, the album has an average score of 66 out of 100, based on eight reviews, indicating "generally favorable reviews". Aggregator AnyDecentMusic? gave it 5.9 out of 10, based on their assessment of the critical consensus.

== Track listing ==
Weird! – Physical edition
No.	Title	Writer(s)	Producer(s)	Length
1.	"Teresa"	Dominic Harrison; Zakk Cervini; Christopher Greatti; Omer Fedi	Yungblud; Cervini; Greatti	3:24
2.	"Cotton Candy"	Harrison; Julia Michaels; Justin Tranter; Greatti; Fedi	Yungblud; Cervini; Greatti; Fedi	2:47
3.	"Strawberry Lipstick"	Harrison; Joshua McClorey; Cervini; Greatti	Yungblud; Cervini; Greatti	2:43
4.	"Mars"	Harrison; Matt Schwartz	Cervini; Greatti; Fedi; Mike Crossey	3:01
5.	"Superdeadfriends"	Harrison; Cervini; Greatti	Yungblud; Cervini; Greatti	2:20
6.	"Love Song"	Harrison; Ben Jackson; Tranter; Greatti; Michael Crossey	Yungblud; Cervini; Greatti	4:00
7.	"God Save Me, but Don't Drown Me Out"	Harrison; Cervini; Greatti	Yungblud; Cervini; Greatti	3:37
8.	"Ice Cream Man"	Harrison; Schwartz	Yungblud; Cervini; Greatti; Schwartz	3:12
9.	"Weird!"	Harrison; Schwartz	Yungblud; Cervini; Greatti; Schwartz	3:03
10.	"Charity"	Harrison; Cervini; Greatti	Yungblud; Cervini; Greatti	3:39
11.	"It's Quiet in Beverly Hills"	Harrison; Schwartz	Yungblud; Cervini; Greatti; Schwartz	2:36
12.	"The Freak Show"	Harrison; Cervini; Greatti; Schwartz	Yungblud; Cervini; Greatti	4:27
Total length:				38:49

Weird! – Japanese edition bonus tracks
No.	Title	Writer(s)	Producer(s)	Length
13.	"Braindead!"	Harrison; Schwartz	Schwartz	2:43
14.	"Parents"	Harrison; Tranter; Cervini; Greatti	Yungblud; Cervini; Greatti	2:51
15.	"Original Me" (featuring Dan Reynolds of Imagine Dragons)	Harrison; Tranter; Crossey; Richard Koehler; Daniel Reynolds; Jorgen Odegard; Timothy Randolph	Odegard; Randolph	3:25
16.	"Casual Sabotage"	Harrison; Schwartz	Schwartz	3:08
17.	"Hope for the Underrated Youth"	Harrison; Danny Snodgrass Jr.; Cervini; Greatti; Schwartz; Michael Rennie; Adam Warrington	Yungblud; Cervini; Greatti	4:00
18.	"Waiting on the Weekend"	Harrison; Shane Gilliver; Crossey	Crossey	2:32
Total length:				58:28

Weird! – Digital edition
No.	Title	Writer(s)	Producer(s)	Length
1.	"Teresa"	Harrison; Cervini; Greatti; Fedi	Yungblud; Cervini; Greatti	3:24
2.	"Parents"	Harrison; Tranter; Cervini; Greatti; Jonas Jeberg	Yungblud; Cervini; Greatti	2:51
3.	"Cotton Candy"	Harrison; Michaels; Tranter; Greatti; Fedi	Yungblud; Cervini; Greatti; Fedi	2:47
4.	"Strawberry Lipstick"	Harrison; McClorey; Cervini; Greatti	Yungblud; Cervini; Greatti	2:43
5.	"Mars"	Harrison; Schwartz	Cervini; Greatti; Fedi; Crossey	3:01
6.	"Superdeadfriends"	Harrison; Cervini; Greatti	Yungblud; Cervini; Greatti	2:20
7.	"Love Song"	Harrison; Jackson; Tranter; Greatti; Crossey	Yungblud; Cervini; Greatti	4:00
8.	"God Save Me, but Don't Drown Me Out"	Harrison; Cervini; Greatti	Yungblud; Cervini; Greatti	3:37
9.	"Ice Cream Man"	Harrison; Schwartz	Yungblud; Cervini; Greatti; Schwartz	3:12
10.	"Weird!"	Harrison; Schwartz	Yungblud; Cervini; Greatti; Schwartz	3:03
11.	"Charity"	Harrison; Cervini; Greatti	Yungblud; Cervini; Greatti	3:39
12.	"Acting Like That" (featuring Machine Gun Kelly)	Harrison; Cervini; Greatti; Nicholas Long; Colson Baker; Travis Barker	Barker	3:11
13.	"It's Quiet in Beverly Hills"	Harrison; Schwartz	Yungblud; Cervini; Greatti; Schwartz	2:36
14.	"The Freak Show"	Harrison; Cervini; Greatti; Schwartz	Yungblud; Cervini; Greatti	4:27
Total length:				44:51

Note

- All track titles are stylized in lowercase

== Personnel ==
=== Musicians ===
- Yungblud – vocals (all tracks), guitar (1–8, 11, 13), bass guitar (1, 3, 6, 8, 11, 13, 14), keyboards (5, 9), programming (5), background vocals (7, 9), percussion (7, 9)
- Chris Greatti - guitar (1–8, 11, 14), bass guitar (1, 3–8, 10, 11, 13, 14), background vocals (3, 8, 9, 12), programming (4, 5), drums (5), keyboards (5, 7, 9), strings (7)
- Adam Warrington - guitar (1, 4, 5, 9)
- Omer Fedi - bass guitar (1, 5, 6), keyboards (5), programming (5, 7)
- Zakk Cervini – programming (1–9, 11, 14), drums (4, 5, 7), percussion (4), keyboards (5), vocal programming (12)
- Michael Rennie - drums (5, 9), percussion (9)
- Mike Crossey – keyboards, programming (5)
- Nick Mira – programming (7)
- Tom Pallant – background vocals (9, 11)
- Matt Schwartz – keyboards, programming (9); bass guitar, guitar, programming (13)
- Machine Gun Kelly – vocals (12)
- Dan Reynolds – vocals (15)

=== Technical ===
- Chris Gehringer – mastering (1, 3, 5–14)
- Joe LaPorta – mastering (2)
- Neal Avron – mixing (1, 2, 4–11, 13, 14), engineering (1, 2, 5–11, 13, 14)
- Serban Ghenea – mixing (3)
- Adam Hawkins – mixing, engineering (12)
- John Hanes – engineering (3)
- K Thrash – engineering (12)
- Matt Malpass – engineering (12)
- Shaan Singh – engineering (12)
- Zakk Cervini – recording (1, 3, 5–9, 11, 13, 14)
- Stevens – recording (5)
- Matt Schwartz – recording (9, 13)

== Charts ==
Chart performance for Weird!
Chart (2020)	Peak position
Australian Albums (ARIA)	6
Austrian Albums (Ö3 Austria)	39
Belgian Albums (Ultratop Flanders)	26
Belgian Albums (Ultratop Wallonia)	118
Czech Albums (ČNS IFPI)	94
Dutch Albums (Album Top 100)	57
French Albums (SNEP)	130
German Albums (Offizielle Top 100)	21
Irish Albums (OCC)	28
Italian Albums (FIMI)	80
Polish Albums (ZPAV)	47
UK Albums (OCC)	1
US Billboard 200	75
US Top Rock Albums (Billboard)	10

== Certifications ==
Region	Certification	Certified units/sales
United Kingdom (BPI)	Gold	100,000^{‡}
^{‡} Sales+streaming figures based on certification alone.
