= 11 Minutes (song) =

2019 song by Yungblud and Halsey

Single by Yungblud and Halsey featuring Travis Barker
- Released: 13 February 2019
- Genre: Emo pop; rap rock
- Length: 4:00
- Label: Locomotion; Geffen
- Songwriters: Dominic Harrison; Ashley Frangipane; Matt Schwartz; Brynley Rose Plumb
- Producers: Matt Schwartz; Chris Greatti; Zakk Cervini; Travis Barker

Yungblud singles chronology
"Loner" (2019)	"11 Minutes" (2019)	"Parents" (2019)

Halsey singles chronology
"Without Me" (2018)	"11 Minutes" (2019)	"Boy with Luv" (2019)

Travis Barker singles chronology
"Hammer" (2018)	"11 Minutes" (2019)	"I Think I'm Okay" (2019)

Music video
- "11 Minutes" on YouTube

"11 Minutes" is a song by English musician Yungblud and American singer-songwriter Halsey, featuring American musician Travis Barker of rock group Blink-182. The song was released by Locomotion Recordings and Geffen Records on 13 February 2019. "11 Minutes" was written by Yungblud, Halsey, Matt Schwartz, and Brynley Rose Plumb. Production was handled by his main collaborator Matt Schwartz as well as Chris Greatti, and Zakk Cervini. An official remix of the song by American DJ Kayzo was also released.

== Live performances ==
Yungblud, Halsey, and Barker performed "11 Minutes" live at the 2019 iHeartRadio Music Awards. During the performance, Yungblud and Halsey played electric guitars.

== Music video ==
On February 21, 2019, a music video was released on YouTube showing the 5 stages of grief: denial, anger, bargaining, depression and acceptance. It was directed by music video director and filmmaker Colin Tilley.

== Charts ==
=== Weekly charts ===
Chart (2019)	Peak position
Australia (ARIA)	23
Belgium (Ultratip Bubbling Under Flanders)	2
Belgium (Ultratip Bubbling Under Wallonia)	27
Canada Hot 100 (Billboard)	69
Czech Republic Airplay (ČNS IFPI)	65
Czech Republic Singles Digital (ČNS IFPI)	38
Hungary (Single Top 40)	35
Hungary (Stream Top 40)	27
Ireland (IRMA)	41
Lithuania (AGATA)	23
Netherlands (Dutch Top 40)	35
New Zealand Hot Singles (RMNZ)	6
Scottish Singles Sales (Official Charts)	64
Slovakia Singles Digital (ČNS IFPI)	34
Sweden Heatseeker (Sverigetopplistan)	12
UK Singles (Official Charts)	59
US Bubbling Under Hot 100 (Billboard)	1
US Hot Rock & Alternative Songs (Billboard)	5

=== Year-end charts ===
Chart (2019)	Position
US Hot Rock Songs (Billboard)	16

== Certifications ==
Region	Certification	Certified units/sales
Australia (ARIA)	Platinum	70,000^{‡}
Canada (Music Canada)	Platinum	80,000^{‡}
New Zealand (RMNZ)	Platinum	30,000^{‡}
United Kingdom (BPI)	Silver	200,000^{‡}
United States (RIAA)	Platinum	1,000,000^{‡}
^{‡} Sales+streaming figures based on certification alone.
