= Tissues (song) =

2022 single by Yungblud

Single by Yungblud

from the album Yungblud
- Released: 30 August 2022
- Length: 3:35
- Label: Locomotion; Geffen
- Songwriters: Dominic Harrison; Chris Greatti; Jake Torrey; Jordan Gable; Robert Smith
- Producer: Chris Greatti

Yungblud singles chronology
| "The Emperor" (2022) | "Tissues" (2022) | "I'm a Mess" (2022) |

Louane singles chronology
| "Comment faire" (2021) | "Tissues" (2022) | "Secret" (2022) |

Music video
- "Tissues" on YouTube

"Tissues" is a song by English musician Yungblud which was released on 30 August 2022 as the fifth single from his third studio album Yungblud (2022).

The song was released by labels Locomotion Recordings and Geffen Records. It was written by Yungblud, Chris Greatti, Jake Torrey and Jordan Gable, and produced by Greatti. It samples "Close to Me" by The Cure, and Robert Smith was also given a songwriting credit. Lyrically, the song is about the ups and downs of love.

In November 2022, Yungblud released a new version of the song featuring French singer Louane.

== Background ==
The song was originally released on 11 March 2022 as a promotional single before it was officially released as a single. Discussing the genesis of the song, which samples "Close to Me" by The Cure, in an interview with Zane Lowe, Yungblud explained:

I remember when we were making it I was like, "I just want to dance!" I remember we were writing in the studio and the session wasn't going well it was midnight. I was thinking about packing it in and going home but then we opened a crate of Bud Light, started putting songs on that we loved and this came on [Close To Me], and I was just like, "Yo, we should sample this," and every producer in the studio was like, "No, but the publishing," and I'm like, "Shut up about the publishing, get it off iTunes, cut it up, and loop it... let's go." That's what I said to them; I was like, "If I can somehow convince Robert Smith to allow me to do this, I don't care. Like, I've won." It was beautiful. I just wanted to make music that me and my mates want to listen to. That was the formula. And obviously we grew up with this song.

== Live performances ==
Yungblud debuted the song as part of his set at the 2022 Glastonbury Festival alongside other new tracks "I Cry 2" and "The Funeral". The song was performed as part of his halftime show at the NFL London Games on 3 October 2022 held at Tottenham Hotspur Stadium. Yungblud included it as part of his Live Lounge set on 27 October 2022. He also performed the song on Jimmy Kimmel Live! on 12 September 2022 and on The X Factor Italy on 18 November 2022.

== Music video ==
The song's video was released on 2 September 2022. It was filmed in London, directed by Charlie Sarsfield and features Yungblud dancing through various scenes while other people are frozen in time. As the song reaches the final chorus, the frozen people join him in a joyous, energetic choreographed dance routine. In a statement on the video, Yungblud explained “This is a new era for Yungblud. I wanted to dance, I wanted to move, and I wanted to really personify in the video what this song means. It's happiness and it's euphoria and it's letting the fuck go.”

== Credits and personnel ==
- Jordan Gable – songwriter
- Chris Greatti – producer, songwriter, bass, drums, electric guitar, programming
- Dominic Harrison – vocals, songwriter, electric guitar, acoustic guitar
- Mitch McCarthy – engineering, mixing
- Paul Meaney – synthesizer, drum programming
- Randy Merrill – mastering
- Anne Peichert – vocals (remix)
- Matt Schwartz – synthesizer
- Robert Smith – songwriter
- Jake Torrey – songwriter, drums, bass, electric guitar

== Charts ==
Chart performance for "Tissues"
| Chart (2022–2023) | Peak position |
|---|---|
| France Airplay (SNEP) | 40 |
| New Zealand (Recorded Music NZ) | 34 |
| San Marino (SMRRTV Top 50) | 19 |
| US Alternative Airplay (Billboard) | 14 |
