= The Funeral (Yungblud song) =

2022 song by Yungblud

Single by Yungblud

from the album Yungblud
- Released: 11 March 2022
- Genre: Indie rock; pop punk
- Length: 3:31
- Label: Locomotion; Geffen
- Songwriters: Dominic Harrison; Chris Greatti; Jake Torrey; Jordan Gable
- Producer: Chris Greatti (Note: Yungblud is credited as a producer for the demo version of the song, included on "The Funeral" extended play (EP).)

Yungblud singles chronology
"Fleabag" (2022)	"The Funeral" (2022)	"Memories" (2022)

Music video
- "The Funeral" on YouTube

"The Funeral" is a song by English musician Yungblud, released on 11 March 2022 as the lead single from his third studio album Yungblud (2022). The song was released by labels Locomotion Recordings and Geffen Records. "The Funeral" was written by Yungblud, Chris Greatti, Jake Torrey and Jordan Gable, and produced by Greatti. The music video for the song, also released on 11 March 2022, was directed by Christian Breslauer and features Ozzy and Sharon Osbourne.

== Live performances ==
On 28 March 2022, Yungblud performed "The Funeral" on The Late Late Show with James Corden. On 26 April 2022, he performed the song on German talk show Late Night Berlin. In addition to these performances, a live version of the song was included on "The Funeral" extended play (EP), recorded at the Shrine Auditorium in Los Angeles, California.

== Track listing ==
"The Funeral" – digital download / streaming

1. "The Funeral" – 3:31

"The Funeral" – extended play (EP)

1. "The Funeral" – 3:31
2. "The Funeral" (acoustic) – 3:33
3. "The Funeral" (live from the Shrine) – 4:01
4. "The Funeral" (demo) – 0:40

== Credits and personnel ==
Credits adapted from Tidal.

- Yungblud – vocals, songwriter
- Chris Greatti – producer, songwriter, bass, drums, guitar, programming
- Jake Torrey – songwriter
- Jordan Gable – songwriter
- Mike Crossey – engineer, mixing engineer
- Robin Schmidt – engineer
- Stephen Sesso – additional engineer

== Charts ==
Chart performance for "The Funeral"
Chart (2022)	Peak position
New Zealand Hot Singles (RMNZ)	40
UK Singles (Official Charts)	80
US Rock & Alternative Airplay (Billboard)	29

== Certifications ==
Region	Certification	Certified units/sales
United Kingdom (BPI)	Silver	200,000^{‡}
^{‡} Sales+streaming figures based on certification alone.

== Release history ==
Release dates and formats for "The Funeral"
Region	Date	Format(s)	Label(s)	Ref.
United States	March 29, 2022	Alternative radio	Interscope	
