= Yungblud =

English musician (born 1997)

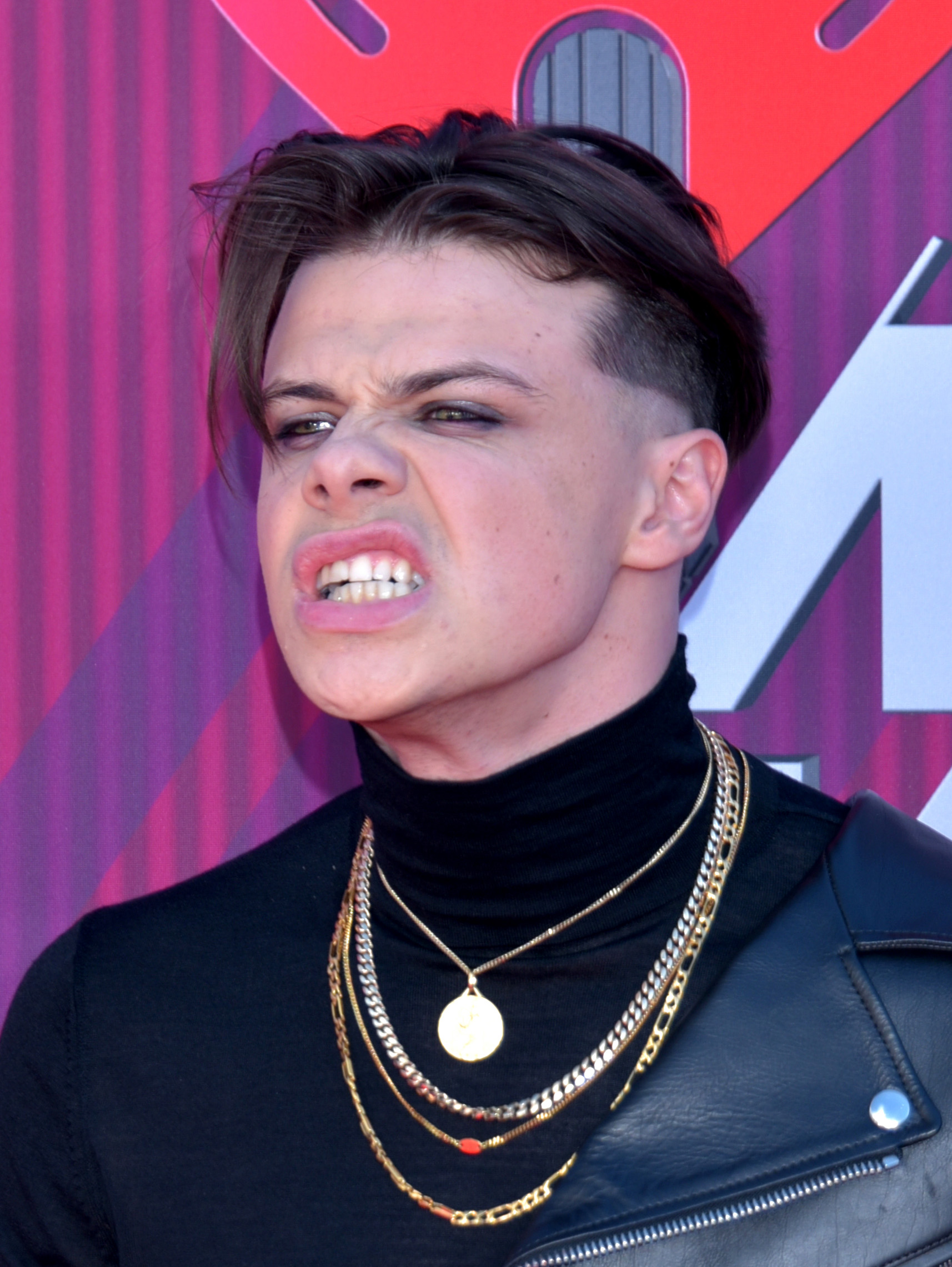
- Yungblud at the 2019 iHeartRadio Music Awards

Background information
- Born: Dominic Richard Harrison; 5 August 1997 (age 29); Doncaster, South Yorkshire, England
- Genres: Alternative rock; pop-punk; pop rock; hip-hop
- Occupations: Musician; singer; songwriter; actor
- Instruments: Vocals; guitar; piano
- Years active: 2015–present
- Labels: Locomotion; Interscope; Geffen; Polydor; Capitol
- Website: yungbludofficial.com

Dominic Richard Harrison (born 5 August 1997), known professionally as Yungblud, is an English musician and actor. In 2018, he released his debut EP Yungblud, followed by his first full-length album 21st Century Liability. In 2019, he released his second EP, The Underrated Youth, and the following year, he released his second studio album, Weird!, which peaked at the top of the UK Albums Chart and reached number 75 on the US Billboard 200. His third album, titled Yungblud like his first EP, was released in 2022 and reached number 1 on the UK Album Charts, as well as number 45 on the Billboard 200 and number 7 on the U.S. Top Rock Albums chart.

== Early life ==
Dominic Richard Harrison was born on 5 August 1997, in Doncaster, South Yorkshire, to Samantha and Justin Harrison. He has two younger sisters, Jemima and Isobel.

Harrison was diagnosed with attention deficit hyperactivity disorder (ADHD) at a young age which, due to a lack of appropriate support for his diagnosis, made him a troublesome student. He was suspended from Ackworth School after a dare from his friend to "moon" his mathematics teacher. Harrison stated that he was an opinionated child and felt that his energetic nature was often misunderstood.

Harrison enrolled at the Arts Educational Schools, London, but quit in 2015 due to what he called its "painting by numbers" approach to creativity.

== Career ==
Before beginning his music career, Harrison was an actor, appearing in the TV series Emmerdale and The Lodge.

=== 2017–2018: Yungblud EP and 21st Century Liability ===
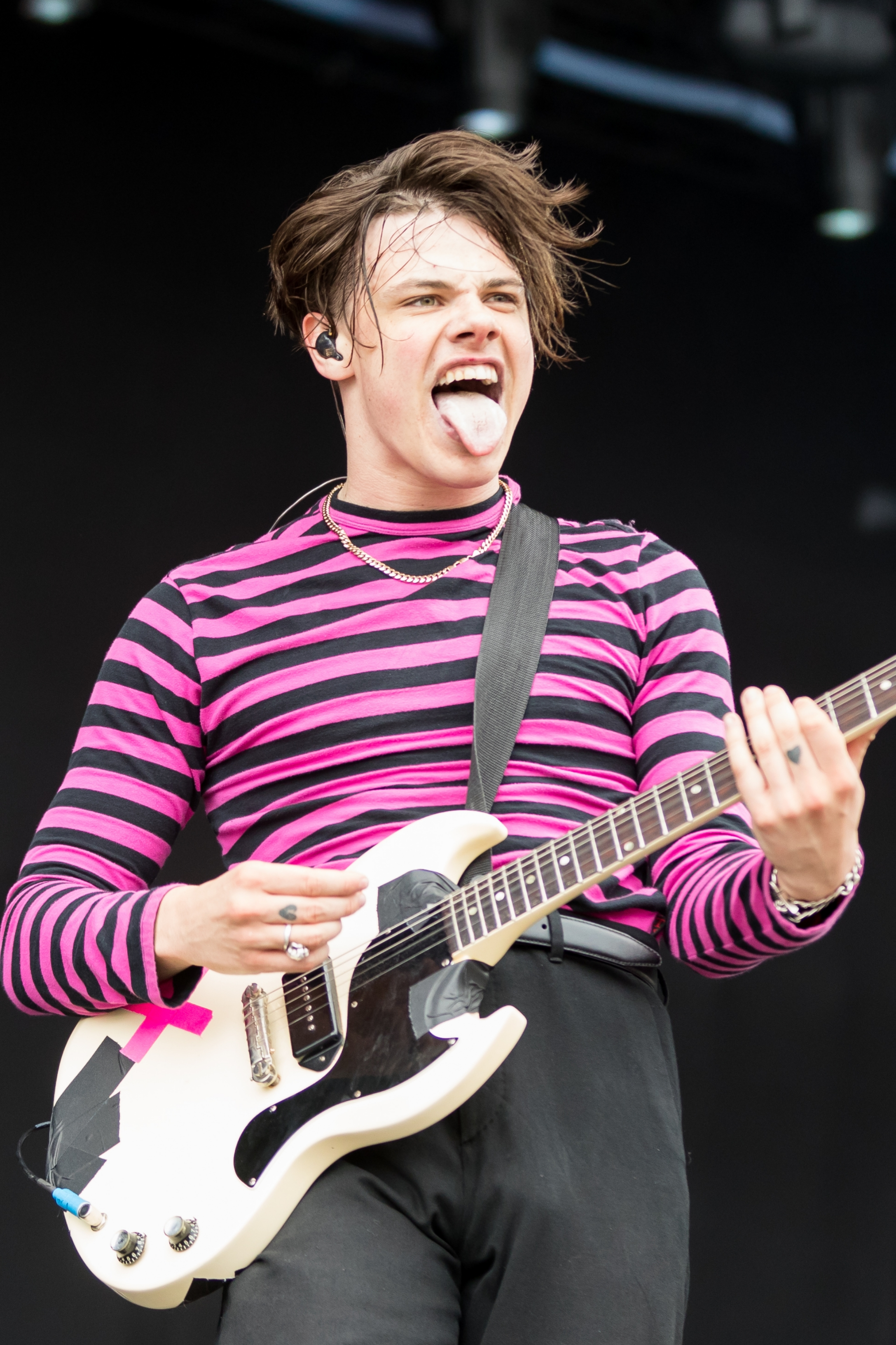
Yungblud performing at Rock am Ring, June 2018

On 7 April 2017, Yungblud released his first single, "King Charles". On 15 September 2017, he released "I Love You, Will You Marry Me", a song about a dark, modern-day love story. On 10 November 2017, he released "Tin Pan Boy", a song about the construction project on Tin Pan Alley, a musical hotspot place in London. On 19 January 2018, he released an EP, Yungblud (stylised in all capitals) which includes the three singles from earlier in the year.

On 19 January 2018, he released "Polygraph Eyes" from the EP, a song about sexual assault against girls. Speaking to Harper's Bazaar, he stated that "it needs to be spoken about from a male perspective, to dilute and smash the shit of this lad mentality that's been so vastly accepted." From 12 to 30 March 2018, he supported K.Flay on her "Everywhere Is Somewhere" tour. On 14 March 2018, he released the music video for "Polygraph Eyes" to YouTube.

On 6 July, Yungblud released his first album, 21st Century Liability. In July 2018, he headed to the United States, hitting several tour dates a part of Vans Warped Tour. On 10 August he released an EP, containing seven acoustic versions of songs from 21st Century Liability, called Yungblud (Unplugged). In August 2018, the music video for "Falling Skies" featuring Charlotte Lawrence was released from the season 2 soundtrack of Netflix's series 13 Reasons Why. From 20 September 2018 to 20 April 2019 he toured for his debut album, with Arrested Youth joining the American dates and Carlie Hanson joining the UK and Europe dates.

=== 2019–2020: The Underrated Youth and Weird! ===
On 17 January 2019, he released the single "Loner". On 14 February 2019, he released the single "11 Minutes" with Halsey and Travis Barker along with its music video. Lyrically, the song is about a relationship that fails due to self-sabotage. He released his first live album Yungblud (Live in Atlanta) 22 March 2019.

From 3 May 2019 to 31 August 2019, he embarked on the Don't Wanna Be a Loner tour, including some festival dates. "Parents" was the first single released from The Underrated Youth EP. It was released 24 May 2019 and described by Yungblud as a song about individualism. "I Think I'm Okay" was released by Machine Gun Kelly, Harrison and Travis Barker on 7 June 2019. On 26 July 2019, Yungblud was featured in the soundtrack for Fast & Furious: Hobbs & Shaw with a cover of Jim Croce's "Time in a Bottle". On 29 July 2019, the single "Hope For the Underrated Youth" was premiered on BBC Radio 1 during Annie Mac's Future Sounds as Annie Mac's Hottest Record in the World.

"Original Me" featuring Dan Reynolds from Imagine Dragons was released in October 2019. They performed the song live on The Late Show with Stephen Colbert on 23 October. Yungblud's The Underrated Youth EP was released 18 October 2019 after some delays. Yungblud announced on 17 May 2019 he was creating a comic book entitled "Twisted Tales of the Ritalin Club" for release in October 2019. He attended MCM Comic Con on 25 October 2019 to promote the book. On 31 October 2019, the music video for "Die a Little" from the 13 Reasons Why soundtrack was released. The video was meant to take a stand for mental health awareness. In an interview with Capital FM, Blackbear revealed that he had a collaboration with Yungblud and Marshmello. The collaboration was revealed to be a song called "Tongue Tied" and was announced to be released 13 November. "Tongue Tied" was released 13 November alongside the music video, starring Joey King, on YouTube.

He was nominated for four NME awards: "Best British Solo Act", "Best Music Video" for "Original Me", "Best Solo Act in the World" and "Best Collaboration" also for "Original Me". He won "Best Music Video" for "Original Me". On 4 March 2020, Yungblud announced he cancelled his Asia tour due to the COVID-19 pandemic. Coachella's organisers then announced that they postponed the music festival from April to October also due to the COVID-19 pandemic. After his shows got cancelled, he came up with the Yungblud show, so he could give his fans a concert experience. On 22 April 2020, he released "Weird!". On 16 July, "Strawberry Lipstick" was released. Weird!, originally set to be released on 13 November 2020, was pushed back to 4 December 2020.

=== 2021–2022: Yungblud ===
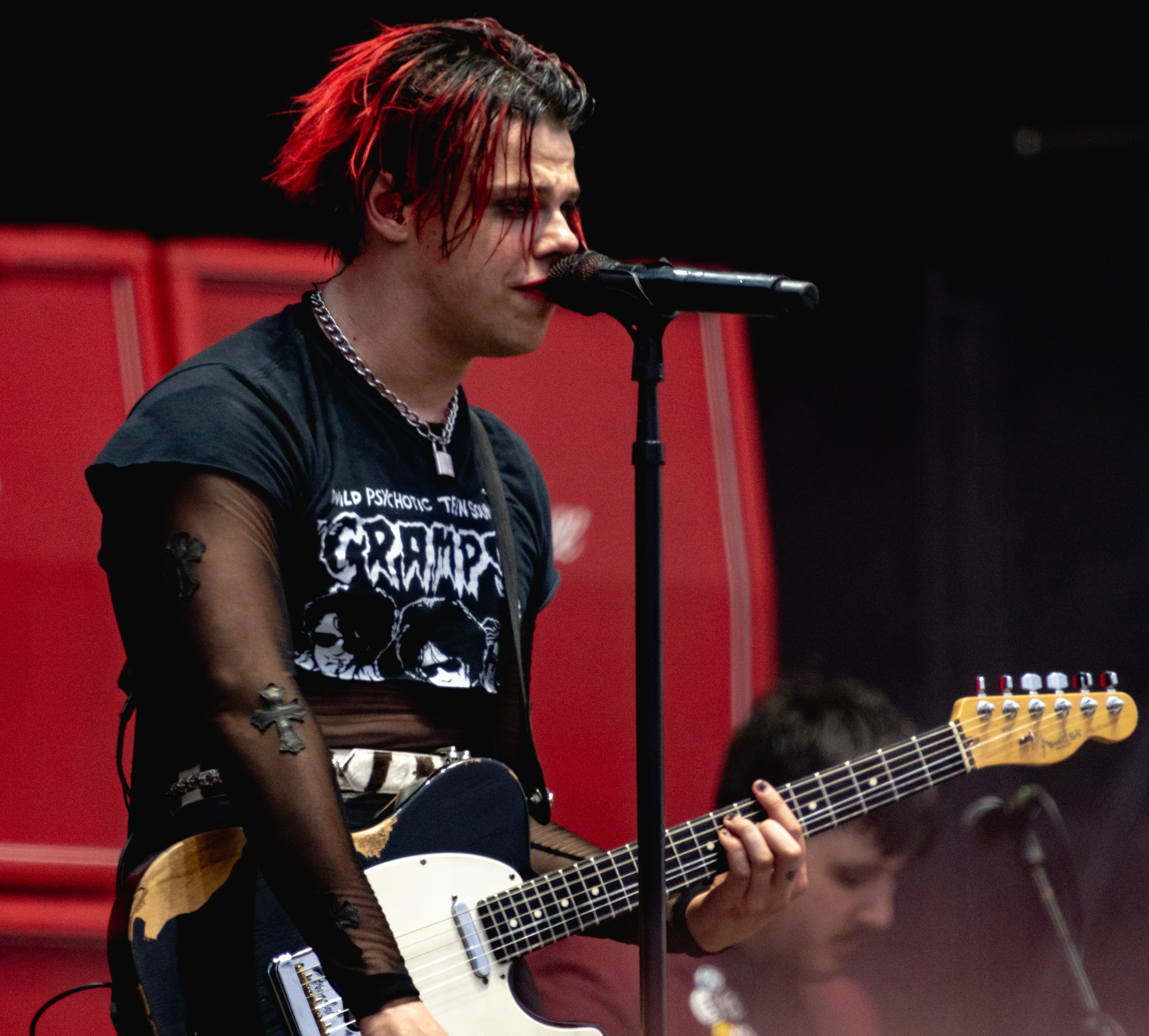
Yungblud performing at Reading Festival, August 2021

On 9 January 2021, he participated in the online event "A Bowie Celebration: Just for One Day", covering David Bowie's "Life on Mars?" On 18 February 2021, the live cover was chosen as a soundtrack for NASA's Perseverance rover landing on Mars. On 19 August 2021, he released his single "Fleabag"; it charted at number 78 in the UK. In November 2021, it was announced that Yungblud would release his first short film based on his 2020 song "Mars". The film is a collaboration between Mercury Studios and Interscope Films and focuses on one of the singer's fans named Charlie Acaster, who was struggling to convince her parents that she is transgender. On 11 March 2022, Yungblud released his single, "The Funeral", accompanied by the music video, released on YouTube, starring Sharon Osbourne and Ozzy Osbourne. "Memories", featuring American singer Willow, was the second single, released 6 May 2022. The music video for the single was released on YouTube the same day, featuring an appearance from YouTuber and Twitch streamer Valkyrae.

Yungblud revealed the cover art and release date for his third studio album on 17 May, during a livestream. "Don't Feel Like Feeling Sad Today" was the third single, released 29 June 2022. "Tissues" was the fourth single, released 30 August 2022, the song notably samples "Close to Me" by the Cure. The third studio album, Yungblud, was released on 2 September 2022.

=== 2023–present: "Lowlife", Idols ===
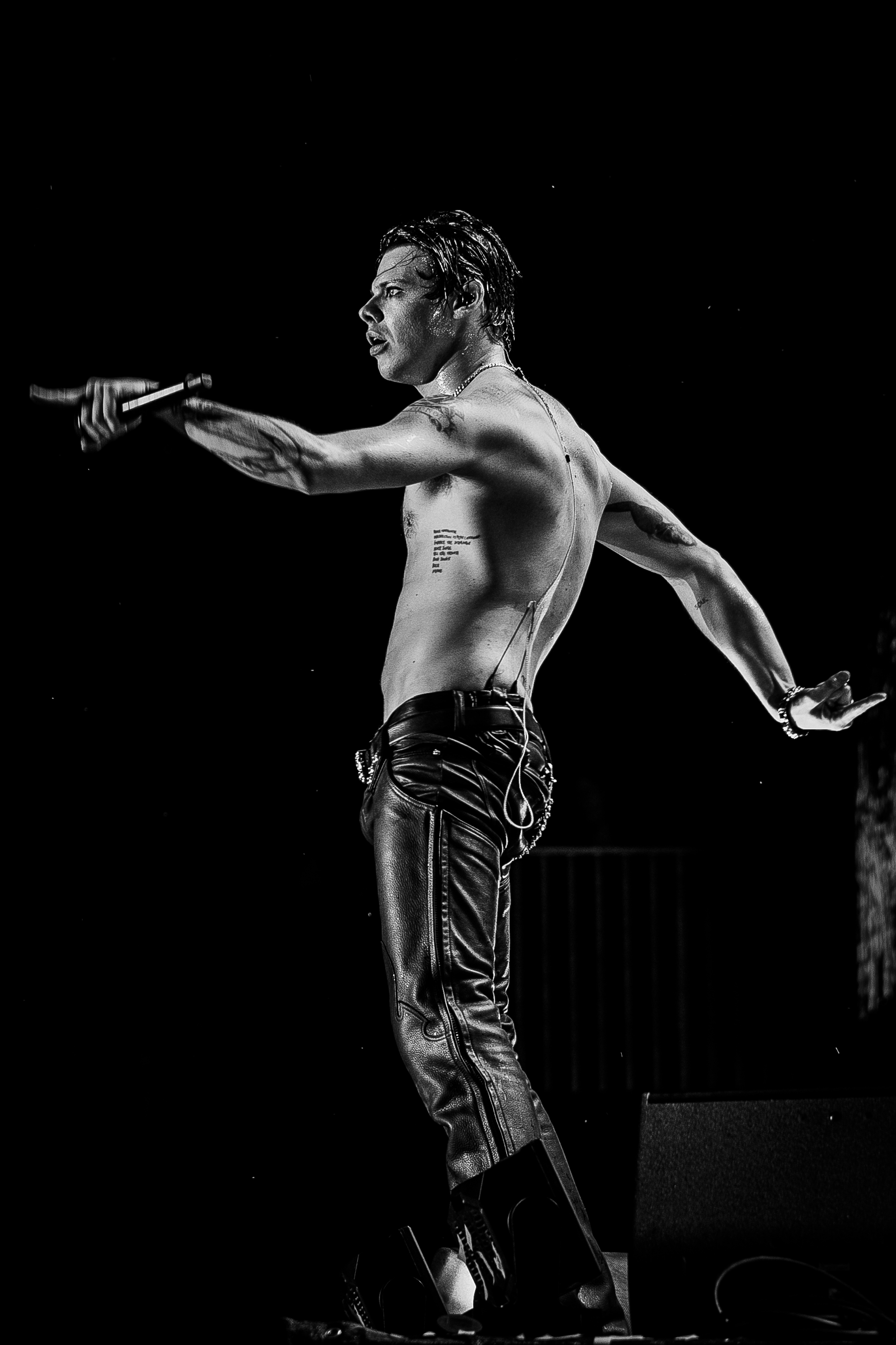
Yungblud performing at Taubertal-Festival, August 2025

Yungblud performed at Coachella 2023. Yungblud began teasing a new song and a new era on 30 May 2023. He sent fans letters in the mail that gave instructions for a location to go to for three different places: Los Angeles, London, and Rock am Ring Germany. Fans in those places would find a car spray painted with the word "Lowlife" on it, and were allowed to hear a snippet of the eponymous new song. "Lowlife" was released 7 June 2023. On 29 March 2024, Yungblud released "Abyss"; the song is used as the opening theme for the Kaiju No. 8 anime series.

In March 2024, Yungblud announced Bludfest, a music festival he founded to offer an alternative to conventional festivals, with an emphasis on affordable ticket prices. The inaugural edition took place at the National Bowl in Milton Keynes in August 2024. The festival returned to the venue in 2025 and expanded internationally with an edition in Hradec Králové, Czech Republic, in June 2026.

On 18 March 2025, Yungblud released the single "Hello Heaven, Hello" from his fourth studio album, Idols. The follow-up singles "Lovesick Lullaby" and "Zombie" also preceded the album; the latter premiered alongside a music video starring the actress Florence Pugh. Idols was released on 20 June through Locomotion Recordings and Capitol Records, as the first half of a two-part project set to be finished the same year.

On 5 July 2025, Yungblud performed a cover of "Changes" at Ozzy Osbourne's final Black Sabbath concert Back to the Beginning at Villa Park, Birmingham. Backstage, he gave Osbourne a sterling silver gold cross necklace set with diamonds, returning the favour for a similar gift Osbourne had given him during the filming of "The Funeral" video in 2022. Yungblud released the performance as a charity single on 18 July 2025, with all proceeds going to benefit Acorns Children's Hospice, Birmingham Children's Hospital, and Cure Parkinson's. The song debuted at number 1 on the UK Singles Downloads Chart.

On 15 November 2025, Yungblud announced that he had to cancel his remaining 2025 tour dates due to health issues. Yungblud and Aerosmith released a collaborative EP titled One More Time on 21 November 2025. During the spring and summer of 2026, he continued his IDOLS world tour in UK and USA, with the support of The Warning.

== Activism ==
On 24 March 2018, Yungblud attended the March for Our Lives rally, a student-led demonstration rally against gun violence. He live-streamed the event. On 30 May 2020, he attended the George Floyd protests for Black Lives Matter in California. He and Halsey helped give first aid to some of the protesters.

In September 2021, Yungblud was among several singer-songwriters who expressed opposition to the Texas Heartbeat Act that banned abortion in Texas after around six weeks of pregnancy, stating that "The right to your body is yours and yours alone. It makes me sick and it makes me really disgusted that people sit there and they take away that choice and they take away that right."

On 24 September 2022, during his performance at the Firefly Music Festival in Dover, Delaware, Yungblud spoke about the death of Mahsa Amini and expressed his support for the resulting protests and civil unrest in Iran.

On 15 January 2026, during his performance at the Sidney Myer Music Bowl Yungblud spoke about the 2025–2026 Iranian protests and the 2026 Iran massacres, calling people to speak out for Iran, as the country is in an Internet blackout. He stated that "we have to be their f**king light right now".

== Musical style and influences ==
Yungblud's music has been described as alternative rock, pop-punk, pop rock, and hip-hop. Yungblud cites rock, pop and hip-hop artists such as Arctic Monkeys and Alex Turner, The Beatles, The Cure and Robert Smith, Nirvana, Avril Lavigne, the Clash, Soundgarden, My Chemical Romance, Marilyn Manson, Lady Gaga, Lorde, Post Malone, Kanye West, Eminem, and Katy Perry as influences. He also namechecked singers Freddie Mercury, Mick Jagger, Elton John, as well as the Sex Pistols, Chrissie Hynde and Siouxsie Sioux of Siouxsie and the Banshees.

Yungblud also had a close friendship with mentor Ozzy Osbourne, calling Osbourne "the greatest of all time" after his death.

== Personal life ==
=== Health issues ===
In August 2018, Yungblud tweeted that he has insomnia. In February 2020, he spoke to the Evening Standard and said that he had attempted suicide twice after going through a series of positive and negative events in his career.

=== Relationships and sexuality ===
He described himself as sexually fluid in an interview with Attitude in August 2019. In another interview with the magazine in December 2020, he described himself as pansexual and polyamorous.

He was in a relationship with American singer Halsey for several months; she confirmed their break-up in October 2019. Almost a year later, on Jessie Ware's Table Manners podcast, in November 2020, Yungblud said that they broke up because they worked better as friends.

Yungblud announced in June 2021 that he is dating American singer and fashion designer Jesse Jo Stark.

== Discography ==
Studio albums

- 21st Century Liability (2018)
- Weird! (2020)
- Yungblud (2022)
- Idols (2025)

== Filmography ==
Film
Year	Title	Role	Notes	Ref.
2019	Lonely Together: A Short Film	Himself	Short film	
2022	Mars	—N/a	Director, short film	
2025	Yungblud. Are You Ready, Boy?	Himself	Documentary	

Television
Year	Title	Role	Notes	Ref.
2015	Emmerdale	Matt	1 episode	
2016	The Lodge	Oz	6 episodes	
2021	From the Top: Olympians and Rockstars	Himself	Episode: "Sky Brown and Yungblud"	

== Awards and nominations ==
Year	Award	Category	Work	Result
2019	NME Awards	Best Music Video	"Original Me" (shared with Dan Reynolds)	Won
2019	NME Awards	Best Collaboration	"Original Me" (shared with Dan Reynolds)	Nominated
2019	NME Awards	Best British Solo Act	Himself	Nominated
2019	NME Awards	Best Solo Act in the World	Himself	Nominated
2020	MTV Video Music Awards	Push Best New Artist	Himself	Nominated
2020	MTV Europe Music Awards	Best New Act	Himself	Nominated
2020	MTV Europe Music Awards	Best Push Act	Himself	Won
2020	Attitude Awards	Gamechanger	Himself	Won
2021	BRIT Awards	British Male Solo Artist	Himself	Nominated
2022	O2 Silver Clef Awards	Best Live Act	Himself	Won
2022	Los 40 Music Awards	Best International New Act	Himself	Won
2026	Grammy Awards	Best Rock Performance	"Changes"	Won
2026	Grammy Awards	Best Rock Song	"Zombie"	Nominated
2026	Grammy Awards	Best Rock Album	Idols	Nominated
