= Brit Awards 2010 =

British music awards ceremony

- Date: 16 February 2010
- Venue: Earls Court
- Hosted by: Peter Kay

Highlights
- Most awards: Lady Gaga (3)
- Most nominations: Florence and the Machine, JLS, Lady Gaga, Lily Allen and Pixie Lott (3)

Television/radio coverage
- Network: ITV
- Viewership: 5.8 million

Brit Awards 2010 was the 30th edition of the British Phonographic Industry's annual Brit Awards. The awards ceremony was held at Earls Court in London for the last time. The ceremony was broadcast live on ITV on Tuesday 16 February 2010. It was hosted by Peter Kay with Fearne Cotton doing the side of stage coverage. ITV2 broadcast an after show highlights programme immediately after the main broadcast. BBC Radio 1 had official radio coverage throughout the day in the run up to the evening's show, with Scott Mills and Greg James on the Red Carpet.

The ceremony was broadcast live, but with a short delay to enable any offensive language to be cut. This occurred several times during the course of the evening, most notably when Liam Gallagher collected the Best Album of 30 Years award and also during Lily Allen's acceptance speech for Best British Female.

The ITV show drew 5.8 million viewers between 8pm and 10pm, which was a 21.9% share of the evening, topping the 5.18 million (21.7%) drawn in for the 2009 ceremony, but still down on the 6.07 million (24.4%) of 2008. The ITV2 Brits Encore show at 10pm drew 776,000 viewers, a 3.8% share.

== Performances ==
Artist(s)	Song(s)	UK Singles Chart Reaction (week ending 27 February 2010)	UK Albums Chart Reaction (week ending 27 February 2010)
Lily Allen	"The Fear"	89 (re-entry)	It's Not Me, It's You – 19 (+9)
JLS	"Beat Again"	73 (+18)	JLS – 17 (+6)
Kasabian	"Fire"	42 (re-entry)	West Ryder Pauper Lunatic Asylum – 20 (+43); Empire – 98 (re-entry)
Lady Gaga	"Telephone" "Dance in the Dark"	34 (+5) did not chart	The Fame – 2 (+3)
Florence and the Machine; Dizzee Rascal	"You Got the Dirtee Love"	2 (debut)	Florence and the Machine; Lungs – 3 (+6) Dizzee Rascal; Tongue n' Cheek – 33 (+40)
Jay-Z; Alicia Keys	"Empire State of Mind"	16 (+9)	The Blueprint 3 – 10 (+12)
Cheryl Cole	"Fight for This Love"	36 (+7)	3 Words – 32 (+6)
Robbie Williams	"Bodies" "Let Me Entertain You" "Feel" "Supreme" "Millennium" "Come Undone" "Morning Sun" "You Know Me" "No Regrets" "Angels" "Everything Changes" "Rock DJ" "Rudebox"	N/A; N/A; N/A; N/A; N/A; N/A; N/A; 49 (+19); N/A; N/A; N/A; N/A; N/A	Reality Killed the Video Star – 8 (+13); Greatest Hits – 38 (re-entry)

== Winners and nominees ==
British Album of the Year (presented by Tom Ford)	British Producer of the Year
Florence and the Machine – Lungs; Dizzee Rascal – Tongue n' Cheek; Kasabian – West Ryder Pauper Lunatic Asylum; Lily Allen – It's Not Me, It's You; Paolo Nutini – Sunny Side Up	Paul Epworth; Ethan Johns; Jim Abbiss; Steve Lillywhite
British Single of the Year (presented by Alan Carr)	Critics' Choice Award (presented by Courtney Love)
JLS – "Beat Again"; Alesha Dixon – "Breathe Slow"; Alexandra Burke (featuring Flo Rida) – "Bad Boys"; Cheryl Cole – "Fight for This Love"; Joe McElderry – "The Climb"; La Roux – "In for the Kill"; Lily Allen – "The Fear"; Pixie Lott – "Mama Do (Uh Oh, Uh Oh)"; Taio Cruz – "Break Your Heart"; Tinchy Stryder (featuring N-Dubz) – "Number 1"	Ellie Goulding; Marina and the Diamonds; Delphic
British Male Solo Artist (presented by Andy Serkis)	British Female Solo Artist (presented by Shirley Bassey)
Dizzee Rascal; Calvin Harris; Mika; Paolo Nutini; Robbie Williams	Lily Allen; Bat for Lashes; Florence and the Machine; Leona Lewis; Pixie Lott
British Group (presented by Idris Elba)	British Breakthrough Act (presented by Geri Halliwell)
Kasabian; Doves; Friendly Fires; JLS; Muse	JLS; Florence and the Machine; Friendly Fires; La Roux; Pixie Lott
International Male Solo Artist (presented by Mel B)	International Female Solo Artist (presented by Jonathan Ross)
Jay-Z; Bruce Springsteen; Eminem; Michael Bublé; Seasick Steve	Lady Gaga; Ladyhawke; Norah Jones; Rihanna; Shakira
International Album (presented by Mika)	International Breakthrough Act (presented by Cat Deeley)
Lady Gaga – The Fame; Animal Collective – Merriweather Post Pavilion; The Black Eyed Peas – The E.N.D.; Empire of the Sun – Walking on a Dream; Jay-Z – The Blueprint 3	Lady Gaga; Animal Collective; Daniel Merriweather; Empire of the Sun; Taylor Swift
British Album of 30 Years (presented by Noddy Holder)	Live Performance of 30 Years (presented by Samantha Fox)
Oasis – (What's the Story) Morning Glory? (1996 Winning British Album); Sade – Diamond Life (1985 Winning British Album); Phil Collins – No Jacket Required (1986 Winning British Album); Dire Straits – Brothers in Arms (1987 Winning British Album); The Verve – Urban Hymns (1998 Winning British Album); Travis – The Man Who (2000 Winning British Album); Dido – No Angel (2002 Winning British Album); Coldplay – A Rush of Blood to the Head (2003 Winning British Album); Keane – Hopes and Fears (2005 Winning British Album); Duffy – Rockferry (2009 Winning British Album)	Spice Girls – "Wannabe" / "Who Do You Think You Are" (1997 Live Performance); The Who – "Who Are You" (1988 Live Performance); Bros – "I Owe You Nothing" (1989 Live Performance); Pet Shop Boys – "Go West" (1994 Live Performance); Take That – "The Beatles Medley" (1994 Live Performance); Michael Jackson – "Earth Song" (1996 Live Performance); Bee Gees – "Stayin' Alive" / "How Deep Is Your Love" (1997 Live Performance); Robbie Williams and Tom Jones – "The Full Monty Medley" (1998 Live Performance); Eurythmics and Stevie Wonder – "There Must Be an Angel (Playing with My Heart)" (1999 Live Performance); Kylie Minogue – "Can't Get You Out of My Head" (2002 Live Performance); Coldplay – "Clocks" (2003 Live Performance); Scissor Sisters – "Take Your Mama" (2005 Live Performance); Kanye West – "Gold Digger" (2006 Live Performance); Paul McCartney – "Live and Let Die" (2008 Live Performance); Girls Aloud – "The Promise" (2009 Live Performance)

=== Outstanding Contribution to Music ===
- Robbie Williams

== Multiple nominations and awards ==
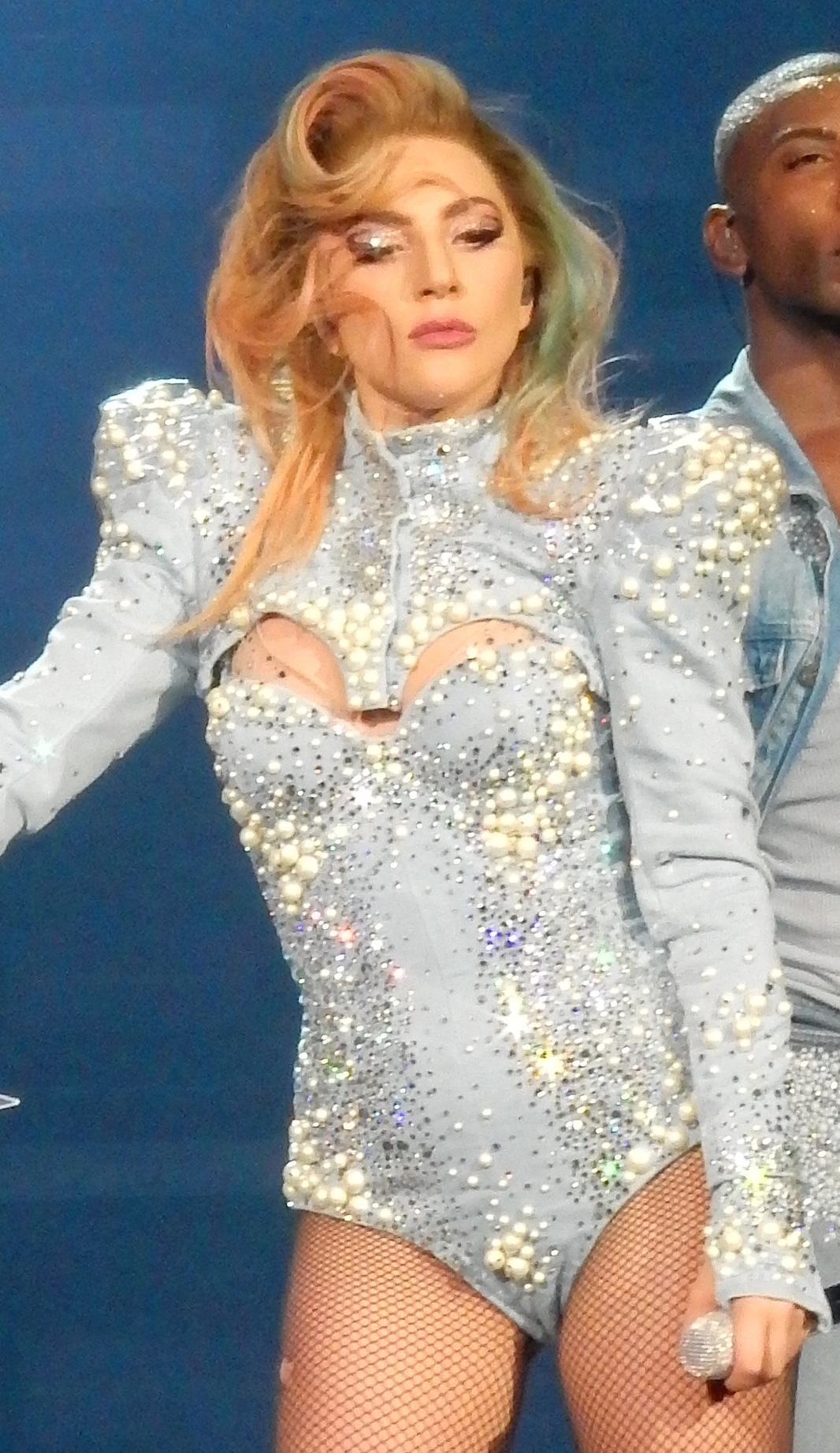
Three-time winner Lady Gaga with most nominations and awards

Artists that received multiple nominations
Nominations	Artist
3 (5)	Florence and the Machine
3 (5)	JLS
3 (5)	Lady Gaga
3 (5)	Lily Allen
3 (5)	Pixie Lott
2 (9)	Animal Collective
2 (9)	Coldplay
2 (9)	Dizzee Rascal
2 (9)	Empire of the Sun
2 (9)	Friendly Fires
2 (9)	Jay-Z
2 (9)	Kasabian
2 (9)	La Roux
2 (9)	Paolo Nutini

Artists that received multiple awards
Awards	Artist
3	Lady Gaga
2	JLS

== Moments ==
=== Liam Gallagher and Peter Kay ===
At the 2010 Brits, Liam Gallagher made a surprise appearance to accept his award for Best Brits album of the past 30 years. After thanking all of his former bandmates (apart from brother Noel) and declaring his fans "the best fans in the fucking world", he gave his award to a lucky fan and hurled his microphone into the audience; a search for the microphone caused a 10‑minute delay. After walking off stage, host Peter Kay reacted to Liam's actions by saying "what a knobhead".
