= Parachute (Cheryl Cole song) =

2010 single by Cheryl Cole

Single by Cheryl Cole

from the album 3 Words
- B-side: "Just Let Me Go"
- Released: 11 March 2010
- Recorded: 2009
- Studio: Metropolis (London, UK)
- Genre: Pop; R&B
- Length: 3:40
- Label: Fascination; Polydor
- Songwriters: Ingrid Michaelson; Marshall Altman
- Producer: Syience

Cheryl Cole singles chronology
"3 Words" (2009)	"Parachute" (2010)	"Promise This" (2010)

Music video
- "Cheryl Cole - Parachute (Official Video)" on YouTube

"Parachute" is a song by English singer Cheryl Cole from her debut studio album, 3 Words (2009). It was written by Marshall Altman and Ingrid Michaelson, music production by American producer Syience. "Parachute" was released on 11 March 2010 as the album's third and final single and became Cole's third consecutive solo UK top 5 hit, and her third Irish top 10 hit. It was nominated for a Brit Award in 2011.

== Composition ==
"Parachute" is written by Ingrid Michaelson and Marshall Altman and combines R&B rhythms with pop melodies. It also makes use of military percussion, strings and a big pop music-hook with quirky melodic verses that were compared to "3" by Britney Spears. The melody was said to resemble "beats from the Argentine Tango" whilst Cole makes use of auto-tuning for her vocals. It was initially put forward as one of the options for the lead single of the album but "Fight for This Love" was chosen instead.

Lyrically the song was criticised for being "mundane" but also well written enough to "get horribly stuck in everyone's heads". The song has an overall "tender and mourningful" theme. Critics noted that "Parachute" was one of several songs on the album where there "lurks a deeper undertow of paranoia". Cole also said that the song contains her favourite lyric from the album; "you are your own worst enemy, you'll never win the fight". Other lyrics such as "I don't need a parachute, baby if I got you" led to the song being labelled "sultry" as the subject of the lyrics appeared to be Cole's spouse Ashley though at the time the couple had announced their separation. The timing of the single release was described as "bittersweet" due to the "talk about being safe in the love of another person" in the lyrics.

== Reception ==
=== Critical response ===
The song received positive reviews from music critics. BBC Music's Mike Diver said, in the album's review, that the "Parachute" is "memorable" due to its use of "military percussion" and Nick Levine of Digital Spy claimed that the track contains a "cute combination" of "strings and sweet nothings". Tom Ewing of The Guardian said that the song was "an austere take on modern pop that gives Cole's voice the space it needs" and Louise McCudden of in the News said that, despite having "possibly the most lyrically mundane chorus [she had] ever heard", "Parachute" is a "well-calculated song" that gets stuck in the listener's head. MusicOMH writer Sam Shepherd voiced his belief that the song includes's Cole's best vocal from the album and he praised the "deftly orchestrated production" and Andy Gill of The Independent said that there is an "undertow of paranoia" in the piece. Later, Fraser McAlpine, during his chart blog review of the song, awarded "Parachute" five out of five stars, saying "Cheryl's pleading voice strikes home. Hard. [..] It's nothing to do with anything which is happening in her personal life, I don't need the back-story to get carried away, it's simply that she sings these tender, mournful lyrics as if she means every word." 4 Music described the track as an "instant stand-out" from the album and claimed that Cole's "well-executed vocal performance", together with the mix of "military-style percussion with delicate strings", meant the track would be "another huge hit". It was named as Single of the Week by Ram FM, described as "sultry pop at its finest".

=== Commercial performance ===
Following the initial broadcast of Cheryl Cole's Night In, the song entered the UK Singles Chart at number 65 because of digital downloads, on the issue dated 26 December 2009.

The song re-entered the chart at 88 on 9 January 2010. On 14 February 2010, the single made its top-40 debut by appearing at number 26. By the end of March 2010, the song reached its highest peak of five giving Cole her third consecutive top-five UK hit and third consecutive top-10 hit in Ireland. In Ireland, it had a similar chart trajectory although it did manage to peak at number four, one position higher than in the UK.

== Music video ==
The accompanying music video for "Parachute" was filmed in early January 2010 at Eltham Palace in London and made its debut on T4 at 12.20 GMT on 31 January 2010. The concept of the video is very much the same of that of the performance on Cheryl Cole's Night In; Cole performs a Latin dance routine with 3-time Emmy award-winning choreographer, professional dancer and 6-time Dancing with the Stars champion, Derek Hough, who also choreographed the routine, and a group of other dancers. The video was directed by AlexandLiane and produced by Factory Films.

Digital Spy was complimentary about Cole's choice of attire in the video. Promo News also gave the video a good review and called it "a top-notch pop vid". The video caused some controversy after it was claimed that Cole was using imagery associated with the Hindu goddess Kali.

== Live performances ==
Cole debuted "Parachute" on the television special Cheryl Cole's Night In, which was broadcast on 12 December 2009 on ITV1. During the performance, Cole wore "a hot pink tiered skirt and asymmetrical sequinned body" and she performed a Latin dance with Derek Hough, an Emmy award-winning choreographer, professional dancer and 6-time champion of Dancing with the Stars. Rick Fulton of the Daily Record was complimentary of the performance as he compared the dance routine that accompanied "Parachute" to a routine from the programme Strictly Come Dancing.

Cole was due to perform the track on Friday Night with Jonathan Ross on Friday 12 March 2010 and on the BBC Radio 1 Live Lounge however pulled out after contracting bronchitis. "Parachute" was performed live on Sport Relief on 19 March 2010. On 23 March 2010, Cole rescheduled her performance of the BBC Radio 1 Live Lounge, where she performed "Parachute", as well as a cover of Owl City's "Fireflies".

== Track listing ==
- Buzz Junkies Dub Single
1. "Parachute" (Buzz Junkies Dub Remix) – 5:38
- Buzz Junkies Radio Single
1. "Parachute" (Buzz Junkies Radio Remix) – 3:52
- Euphonix Single
1. "Parachute" (Euphonix Instrumental Mix) – 3:12
- Ill Blue Dub Single
1. "Parachute" (Ill Blu Dub Remix) – 4:50
- Ill Blue Radio Single
1. "Parachute" (Ill Blu Radio Remix) – 4:06
- CD single
1. "Parachute" (Radio Mix) – 3:31
2. "Just Let Me Go" – 3:07
- Digital EP
1. "Parachute" – 3:39
2. "Parachute" (Buzz Junkies Club Mix) – 5:44
3. "Parachute" (Ill Blu Remix) – 4:50
4. "Parachute" (The Euphonix Remix) – 3:10
5. "Parachute" (Self-Taught Beats Remix) – 3:41 [UK iTunes Only]

== Credits and personnel ==
"Parachute" was recorded at Metropolis Studios; London, UK and mixes at The Warehouse Studios; Atlanta, Georgia, US.

- Songwriters:
  - "Parachute" – Ingrid Michaelson, Marshall Altman
  - "Just Let Me Go" – Claude Kelly, Reggie "Syience" Perry
- producer – Reggie "Syience" Perry
- recording – Neil Tucker
- mixing – Kevin 'KD' Davis

== Charts and certifications ==
=== Charts ===
Chart (2010)	Peak position
Belgium (Ultratip Bubbling Under Wallonia)	14
CIS Airplay (TopHit)	21
Czech Republic Airplay (ČNS IFPI)	12
Europe (European Hot 100 Singles)	19
Germany (GfK)	78
Ireland (IRMA)	4
Netherlands (Single Top 100)	78
Poland Airplay (ZPAV)	2
Poland (Video Chart)	5
Romania (Romanian Top 100)	1
Russia Airplay (TopHit)	24
Scottish Singles Sales (Official Charts)	2
Slovakia Airplay (ČNS IFPI)	49
UK Singles (Official Charts)	5
Ukraine Airplay (TopHit)	16

=== Year-end charts ===
Chart (2010)	Position
CIS (TopHit)	73
Russia Airplay (TopHit)	90
UK Singles (OCC)	49

2011 year-end chart performance for "Parachute"
Chart (2011)	Position
Ukraine Airplay (TopHit)	124

=== Certifications ===
Region	Certification	Certified units/sales
United Kingdom (BPI)	Gold	400,000^{‡}
^{‡} Sales+streaming figures based on certification alone.

== Release history ==
Region	Date	Format	Label
Ireland	11 March 2010	Digital EP, Digital download: Remixes	Polydor Records
Norway	14 March 2010	Digital: Buzz Junkies Remixes, Ill Blue Remixes, Euphonix Instrumental Mix	Universal Music
United Kingdom	14 March 2010	Digital EP Digital download; Ill Blu Remix	Fascination Records
United Kingdom	15 March 2010	CD Single	Fascination Records
United Kingdom	31 August 2010	Digital download; Buzz Junkies Remix	Fascination Records
Sweden	13 September 2010	Digital EP	Universal Music

== See also ==
- List of Romanian Top 100 number ones of the 2010s
