= 3 Words (song) =

2009 single by Cheryl Cole

Single by Cheryl Cole featuring will.i.am

from the album 3 Words
- B-side: "Boys"
- Released: 20 December 2009
- Recorded: 2009
- Studio: Record Plant (Los Angeles)
- Genre: Dance-pop
- Length: 4:33
- Label: Fascination; Polydor
- Songwriters: William Adams; Cheryl Cole; George Pajon
- Producer: will.i.am

Cheryl Cole singles chronology
"Fight for This Love" (2009)	"3 Words" (2009)	"Parachute" (2010)

will.i.am singles chronology
"All My Life (In the Ghetto)" (2008)	"3 Words" (2009)	"OMG" (2010)

Music video
- "Cheryl Cole - 3 Words ft. will.i.am" on YouTube

"3 Words" is a song recorded by English singer Cheryl Cole for her 2009 debut studio album of the same name. It was released in the UK and Ireland on 20 December 2009 by Fascination Records (Polydor Records) and later in 2010 by Universal Music, serving as the lead single for 3 Words in other countries. The uptempo dance-pop song was written by Cole and George Pajon. It was also written and produced by will.i.am who has guest vocals on the song. "3 Words" was cited by Cole as her favourite song from the album for being different from what people expected.

"3 Words" was praised by contemporary critics, who said it was "a sophisticated love song" and the "standout track" from the album. Its unconventional production abandons the use of "verse-chorus-verse" structure, instead opting for a throbbing buildup to a climax. The accompanying video, directed by Saam, features the singer in various fashion ensembles often contrasting colour with will.i.am, and paying homage to Madonna. It also makes use of split screen cinematography and camera effects for the transition of scenes.

The song was promoted on Cheryl Cole's Night In. The single was less commercially successful compared to its predecessor "Fight for This Love" but despite not peaking at number one, it went on to become Cole's second consecutive UK top-five and Irish-top ten hit. It was also a top five hit in Australia and has since been certified platinum by the Australian Recording Industry Association and silver by the British Phonographic Industry.

== Composition ==
"3 Words"
24 second sample of "3 Words" showing the unconventional arrangement and throbbing progression of the melody.

"3 Words" is an uptempo dance-pop song which features guest vocals from will.i.am who produced the song as well as, writing the lyrics with Cole and George Pajon. Serving as the opening and title song of Cole's debut album, the song is written in the key of C♯ minor with a time signature in common time and a tempo of 129 beats per minute. Noticeably missing is the standard use of a "verse-chorus-verse song structure". The song's backing track consists of a sparse yet complex chord progression of C♯m, G♯m, C♯ and A major/C♯. The production features loops of acoustic guitar with a piano melody in the vocal range of G♯_{3} to B_{4}.

Critics stated that the "sophisticated love song" is difficult to class by genre because it was "unconventional", something which Cole agreed when she said, "[its] totally different from anything I've done [with Girls Aloud] or liked before". Some industry critics also noted that "3 Words" was "unlike many things currently [at that time] on radio or being released". Cole said that the song was inspired by her newly acquired love for dance music on the charts, especially David Guetta & Kelly Rowland's "When Love Takes Over".

== Critical reception ==
Cole described it as her favourite song on the album and music critics generally agreed. Tom Ewing of The Guardian called the song Cheryl's "showcase [...] built on dark loops of treated acoustic guitar and building into a claustrophobic dance track. It's as brave and novel a song as anything Cole's group have released." Daniel Wilcox even went as far as to say the song was "far more interesting and innovative than anything her girl group has done in their entire careers." "3 Words" has been described as "mesmerizing in its listlessness" as well as being "unlike anything Cheryl or Will.I.Am have released" and "to what's currently being played on the radio." It was labeled a standout track by many reviewers, with Killian Fox of The Observer referring to the song as "a slick, sophisticated love song that hints at what this album could have been." David Balls of Digital Spy wrote, "Snubbing traditional verse-chorus-verse song structure, and beginning with spare acoustic guitar strums, '3 Words' builds slowly towards a throbbing and infectious, if slightly brief, arms-in-the-air climax [...] it's hard to deny that Chez pulls off this less-than-obvious offering with aplomb."

Louise McCudden of Inthenews.co.uk, however, argued that although "her voice sounds pleasant [...] the song itself is too long and becomes tedious fairly fast." Vicki Lutas had a mostly negative review for the song saying "at the end of the day it does sound like something you could have made up when you were at school", though she did praise the backing track for being "dark, eerie and cold in a chilling way; in an infectious way". However she pointed out that "the vocal arrangement and the actual vocals themselves do nothing more for the song", and respected that "it's a brave song choice, but it's [sic] hap-hazard vocal line seems to scream... C-R-I-N-G-E.".

== Chart performance ==
In the United Kingdom, "3 Words" made its official debut on the UK Singles Chart at number twenty-six, following strong digital sales from the release of the album, two weeks prior. Then a day before its digital release and two days before its CD release the single climbed to number fourteen. Later during the first week of 2010 it would go on to peak at number four, giving Cole her third consecutive top-five UK hit if her feature on will.i.am's "Heartbreaker" is included. On 14 May 2010 the single was certified silver by the British Phonographic Industry (BPI) for shipping 200,000 copies.

The single also achieved top ten success in the Republic of Ireland, where it reached number seven becoming her third consecutive top-ten single. Coincidentally, it is the second song featuring Cole's vocals to peak at number seven in Ireland, the first being will.i.am's "Heartbreaker". Internationally the single peaked top five in Hungary, and Australia. In the latter it performed better than any song Cole released with Girls Aloud beating the previous best entry "Jump" by eighteen places. "3 Words" is the only song from Cole's debut album to peak within the top fifty of the Australian Singles Chart and was subsequently certified 2× platinum by the Australian Recording Industry Association (ARIA) for shipping 140,000 equivalent units. Additionally it peaked at top-ten in Italy.

The song debuted at 14 on the Recording Industry Association of New Zealand. It later rose to number 12, staying in the charts for 12 weeks.

== Music video ==
=== Background and concept ===
Cole filmed two music videos for "3 Words". The first music video was a viral version directed by Vincent Haycock, in the week beginning 19 October 2009 "on the only rainy night in Los Angeles in six months." The second version was the official "split screener", directed by Saam, that premiered on 27 November 2009. The video was described as being distinctly different from that of previous single "Fight for This Love", drawing comparisons to Madonna and Lady Gaga.

A frame from the "Egyptian-themed" scene in the middle and end of the video, where Cole wears a brunette wig and dances with backing dancers

=== Synopsis ===
The video begins with Cole sitting alongside will.i.am, wearing a "Lady Gaga-inspired platinum blonde wig" and a lace veil. In the third scene she is depicted as an "Egyptian goddess". Each scene incorporates "dance shots interspersed with sequences in which the focus falls on the two stars alone, seemingly searching each other, as it were ... experimenting more with her looks and even taking a chance with Lady Gaga-esque outfits for her dancers, including veils that cover their faces and black leotards." It is shot with a split screen with motion control cameras, meaning Cole and will.i.am do not come into physical contact.

=== Reception ===
The video received mixed to positive reviews from critics who praised Cole's sense of fashion but cited that the video was unoriginal. Elena Gorgan of Softpedia said "even with all this, she hardly manages to create a strong impression ... the video fails to break any visual ground, albeit standing on its own as a stylish video." Lisa McGarry of 'Unreality TV' said the platinum wig was "strange" She also said "if it doesn’t look great, at least it looks shocking." Meanwhile, David Balls of 'Digital Spy' said "[in] this glitzy split-screen affair, Cheryl looks effortlessly classy and glam as she transforms into an Egyptian goddess and – with more success than a certain Mrs. B (Mel B) back in 2001 [with "Feels so Good"] – shows how to wear a blonde wig without looking like you're on a dirty weekend in the Toon. Perfectly complementing the song itself, this super-glossy clip also suggests that Cole has a firm eye on global stardom over the next year." Fame magazine called the video "a little edgier than anything Girls Aloud have done".

== Live performances ==
The song received its worldwide radio premiere on 13 October 2009 on BBC Radio 1's The Chris Moyles Show. Cole performed the song as part of a four-song set at 'BBC Radio 1 Big Weekend as well as performing at the 'De Grisogono jewellery dinner party' at the Eden Rock Hotel in Cap d'Antibes during the Cannes Film Festival.

== Track listing ==
- Digital download
1. "3 Words" (Radio edit) – 4:04
- CD single
1. "3 Words" – 4:04
2. "Boys" (Emeli Sandé, James Murray, Mustafa Omer, Shahid Khan) – 3:41
- Remix EP
1. "3 Words" (Steve Angello Radio Re-Production) – 3:59
2. "3 Words" (Doman & Gooding I Love You Edit) – 3:36
3. "3 Words" (Geeneus-Rinse FM Radio Dub Edit) – 3:33
- Digital EP 1
1. "3 Words" (Album version) – 4:33
2. "3 Words" (Steve Angello Radio Re-Production) – 4:00
3. "3 Words" (Doman & Gooding I Love You Edit) – 3:38
4. "3 Words" (Geeneus-Rinse FM Radio Dub Edit) – 3:33
- Digital EP 2
1. "3 Words" (Radio edit) – 4:04
2. "3 Words" (Steve Angello Extended Re-Production) – 5:42
3. "3 Words" (Doman & Gooding I Love You Remix) – 6:27
4. "3 Words" (Geeneus-Rinse FM Main Mix) – 6:02

== Credits and personnel ==
"3 Words" was recorded at Record Plant Studios, Los Angeles (CA).

- will.i.am – producer
- George Pajon – guitar
- will.i.am – drums, synthesizer, bass
- Padriac "Padlock" Kerin, will.i.am – engineer
- Padriac "Padlock" Kerin – recording
- Dylan Dresdow, will.i.am – mixing

== Charts ==
=== Weekly charts ===
Chart (2009–2010)	Peak position
Australia (ARIA)	5
Australia (ARIA Dance Chart)	2
Austria (Ö3 Austria Top 40)	56
Europe (European Hot 100 Singles)	14
Germany (GfK)	27
Hungary (Single Top 40)	5
Ireland (IRMA)	7
Italy (FIMI)	7
Netherlands (Dutch Top 40)	20
Netherlands (Single Top 100)	32
Poland (Polish Airplay New)	2
Scotland Singles (Official Charts)	6
Slovakia Airplay (ČNS IFPI)	44
UK Singles (Official Charts)	4

=== Year-end charts ===
Chart (2009)	Peak position
UK Singles (OCC)	91

Chart (2010)	Peak position
Australia (ARIA)	59
Australia (ARIA Dance Chart)	14
Italy (FIMI)	83
Italy Airplay (EarOne)	67
UK Singles (OCC)	161

== Certifications ==
Region	Certification	Certified units/sales
Australia (ARIA)	2× Platinum	140,000^{‡}
Italy (FIMI)	Gold	15,000^{*}
United Kingdom (BPI)	Silver	340,000
^{*} Sales figures based on certification alone.^{‡} Sales+streaming figures based on certification alone.

== Release history ==
Region	Date	Format	Label
Ireland	20 December 2009	Digital download, Digital EP 1, Digital EP 2	Polydor Records
United Kingdom	20 December 2009	Digital download, Digital EP 1, Digital EP 2	Fascination Records
United Kingdom	21 December 2009	CD single	Fascination Records
Australia	12 February 2010	Digital download	Universal Music
Australia	12 February 2010	Digital remix EP	Universal Music
Italy	14 April 2010	Digital download	Universal Music
Germany	25 June 2010	Digital download	Universal Music
Belgium	14 July 2010	Digital download	Universal Music
