= Reality Killed the Video Star =

Studio album by Robbie Williams
- Released: 6 November 2009
- Recorded: September 2008 – August 2009
- Studios: Sarm Studios (London); Angel Recording (London); Sarm West Coast (Los Angeles); Capitol (Hollywood)
- Genre: Pop
- Length: 51:30
- Label: Virgin
- Producer: Trevor Horn

Robbie Williams chronology
Rudebox (2006)	Reality Killed the Video Star (2009)	Take the Crown (2012)

Singles from Reality Killed the Video Star
- 1. "Bodies" Released: 4 September 2009; 2. "You Know Me" Released: 23 October 2009; 3. "Morning Sun" Released: 8 March 2010

Reality Killed the Video Star is the eighth solo studio album by the English singer-songwriter Robbie Williams, released in November 2009. The title is a reference to The Buggles' 1979 single "Video Killed the Radio Star", updating it to reflect on the impact of reality television on pop culture. The album was produced by Trevor Horn, who fronted The Buggles and wrote "Video Killed the Radio Star", and was recorded between September 2008 and August 2009 in London and Los Angeles. It debuted in the top ten of 22 national album charts worldwide, but received varying reviews from music critics. Reality Killed the Video Star was viewed by critics and fans as being Williams' "comeback album" after the relative failure of his 2006 release, Rudebox.

The album was preceded by its lead single "Bodies", which was released in October 2009. Other singles released included "You Know Me" and "Morning Sun". The album was certified platinum in Europe for sales of over one million copies, including 900,000 copies sold in the UK alone. Despite this, it was – and, as of 2026, remains – Williams' first and only studio album not to reach number one on the UK Albums Chart, beaten to the top spot by a margin of less than 1% by JLS's self-titled debut album.

== Background ==
Reality Killed the Video Star was Williams' first studio album in three years. In that period, he worked with many producers, including Guy Chambers, Soul Mekanik, Mark Ronson, and Trevor Horn. However, the British singer confirmed in August 2009 on his official website that the entire album was produced by Trevor Horn, and added that it was recorded in London.

Rumours of a new studio album co-written with Chambers had surfaced in early 2007, along with known commitments required by Williams to complete his EMI contract. British singer-songwriter Laura Critchley commented that she had sung vocals for three songs, and said that the LP would not be released until 2009.

At first it was believed that Williams had reunited with Chambers, but it was later confirmed that the song "Blasphemy" was co-written by the pair during the recording sessions of Williams' 2002 album Escapology.

In February 2009, it was confirmed that Williams had written material with Soul Mekanik, Chambers and Ronson. The singer's spokesman, Tim Clark, said that the artist was planning to begin recording sessions in March and that the new album would be released in late 2009. The album was mostly written in Williams' home studio and was recorded in London. Amongst those who collaborated in the songwriting were Danny Spencer and Kelvin Andrews, Brandon Christy, Craig Russo, Richard Scott and Scott Ralph, Chas Jankel and Fil Eisler.

On his official website, Williams wrote that he was working with producer Trevor Horn on his new album; he described himself as "buzzing" and went on to call the album's sound "Very, very big". Williams revealed that the new album would be titled Reality Killed the Video Star, a reference to the song "Video Killed the Radio Star" by Horn's former band The Buggles in 1979. The album was originally planned to be named Il Protagonista (Italian for The Protagonist) until Williams' management told him to change the title as it was "too pretentious". In July 2009 Williams wrote on his official blog about the album: "My album's a killer: old Robbie, new Robbie and a Robbie that neither of us have met...". The A.V. Club has also reported that during 2007, Williams had recorded an unreleased experimental album that, he later said, would have amounted to "career suicide".

Before the album's release, Williams spoke about his hopes for the album: "I want people to feel elated, I want them to dance, I want them to forget about who they are and where they are for 50 minutes – and, within those 50 minutes of forgetting who they are, I also hope people relate to the songs. This is a record that I’m very proud of – I think it’s fucking brilliant. I want it to be the record that, if people think of Robbie Williams, they go, Yeah, Reality Killed the Video Star." He also talked about his collaboration with producer Trevor Horn: "He’s added something to the record that I haven’t had on previous records – his genius".

In the wake of Michael Jackson's death on 25 June 2009, Williams was reported to have written and recorded a last minute tribute song to Jackson that would be included on the album. The track, "Morning Sun", was co-written by James Bond lyricist Don Black who wrote Michael Jackson's 1972 song "Ben". During his BBC Electric Proms concert at The Roundhouse in London on 20 October 2009 Williams said about the song: "I thought it was about Michael Jackson [...] but it's actually about me again."

== Musical style ==
The British singer-songwriter unveiled the album at an industry playback in London, where EMI UK and Ireland president Andria Vidler hosted the event. Mark Sutherland from Billboard said that the album "marks a return to Williams' trademark pop sound after 2006's more experimental – and commercially under-performing – Rudebox". Sutherland felt that even though the lead single 'Bodies', "features a refinement of the more electronic sound debuted on Rudebox, much of the album returns to the fertile, adult pop ground of Williams' previous smash hit albums Escapology and Intensive Care". He felt that the album highlights are the "lush ballads 'Morning Sun' and 'You Know Me', the intricate wordplay of 'Blasphemy' and the 1980s sound of 'Last Days of Disco'", while also noting that "a confident-sounding Williams also experiments with some light psychedelia on 'Deceptacon' and electronic dance music on the anthemic 'Starstruck' and 'Difficult for Weirdos'." Jude Rogers from The Quietus said that the song "Do You Mind?" "puts Status Quo, Slade and a gallon of glam-rock in a bottle, shakes it up, and make an interesting, if rather peculiar, froth." Rogers said that on the track "Starstruck" "Goldfrapp's Felt Mountain, The Ipcress File soundtrack and the shadow of Broadcast fall over the first ten seconds of this song about our obsession with celebrity". "Deceptacon" contains a "peculiar set of lyrics, floating on waves of reverb, sad strings and icy keyboards". Rogers said that "It's an unshowy meditation [on] the shallowness of fame, with a fantastic, mournful outro." Mike Diver from BBC Music said that "Bodies" is "A strange brew of string flourishes, rumbling low end, oriental undertones and even an Enigma-style break into Gregorian territory", Diver also said that "Last Days of Disco" is "reminiscent of Eurythmics".

== Release and promotion ==
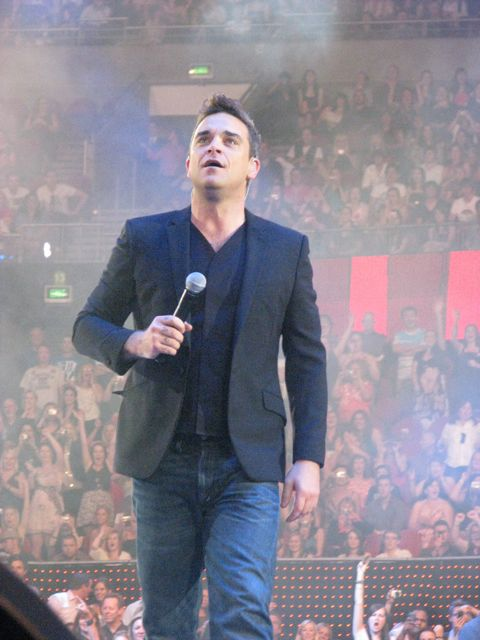
Williams performing at the 2009 ARIA Music Awards in Australia

A special CD called Songbook was given away free with the 11 October 2009 issue of British newspaper The Mail on Sunday. The CD featured twelve classic Robbie Williams tracks, including live recordings from Slane Castle, Cologne, London's The Forum and Knebworth, and also contained six 30-second clips of tracks from Reality Killed the Video Star. The singer appeared on The X Factor on 11 October 2009 to perform "Bodies" live. He was featured on the November 2009 cover of GQ magazine UK, in which he also gave an interview about the album. Williams performed some material from Reality Killed the Video Star on the BBC Electric Proms at The Roundhouse in London on 20 October 2009. It was Williams' first live performance in over three years and was broadcast live in nearly 200 cinemas across Europe on 20 October and a few weeks later in Australia, South Africa and Mexico. The show featured a full band conducted by Trevor Horn. The concert received many positive reviews, and Williams also set a new Guinness World Record for "the most simultaneous cinematic screenings of a live concert". Initially, Williams was set to perform on 5 November 2009 at the MTV Europe Music Awards 2009 in Berlin at the O2 World, however, due to a scheduling conflict, he did not perform.

On 6 November 2009, Williams gave an interview and also performed on Friday Night with Jonathan Ross. On the release day of the album in the UK, 9 November 2009, Williams appeared on Loose Women for a special edition of the show as the only guest. A special intimate live show at The Metro Theatre took place in Sydney on 25 November 2009, where Williams performed material from the new album and some of his hits. He performed his single "Bodies" in Australia at the ARIA Music Awards on 26 November 2009 which was held at the Acer Arena. On Tuesday, 8 December 2009, Williams performed an intimate show in London to less than 200 people at the Radio Theatre in Broadcasting House. An exclusive show was performed by Williams for a limited number of fans at the Melkweg in Amsterdam on 9 December 2009. Williams performed "Angels" on 12 December 2009 as a duet with Olly Murs on the live final of The X Factor, also performing the second single from the album, "You Know Me".

Williams performed "Morning Sun", the third single from Reality Killed the Video Star, on 23 January 2010 at the NRJ Music Awards, where he also received two awards for International Male Artist of the Year and the NRJ Award of Honour. "Morning Sun" was also performed on 13 February 2010 (Williams' 36th birthday) on the UK TV show So You Think You Can Dance. He performed a medley of his greatest hits, including the three singles from Reality Killed the Video Star, on 16 February at the 2010 BRIT Awards where Williams received the Outstanding Contribution to Music Award. He won the award for "Best International Male Artist" at the 2010 Echo Awards in Berlin on 4 March, making it his seventh Echo Award for this category since 2002. Williams also performed "Morning Sun" at the show.

== Singles ==
The song "Bodies" was released as the album's first official single. It premiered on BBC Radio 1 on 4 September 2009. It was released on 12 October 2009, reaching number two on the UK Singles Chart, and being certified Silver for sales in excess of 200,000 copies. It has since reached the top 5 and top 10 in several charts across Europe as well as in Australia. The song was also named one of the best singles of 2009 by the music website Popjustice. Jennifer Cooke from PopMatters said that "Bodies" is "vintage Williams, and his strongest single since 'Feel' (2002). Featuring his two favorite subjects, God and sex (not necessarily in that order)".

"You Know Me" was the second single to be taken from the album. It was released on 7 December 2009 in the UK, where it peaked at number six on the singles chart and was also certified Silver for sales of over 200,000 copies. The song managed to peak inside the top 20 and top 30 on many European charts and in Australia. PopMatters' Jennifer Cooke felt that "You Know Me" had "a Motown flavor reminiscent of Escapology's 'Something Beautiful'." Jude Rogers from The Quietus said that the song is "Nonsensical and brilliant".

"Morning Sun" was issued as the third single from the record. In the UK, it was released as the official Sport Relief Single on 8 March 2010. The music video for the single was directed by Vaughan Arnell and filmed at Universal Studios Hollywood. "Morning Sun" peaked at number 45 on the UK Singles Chart, making it Williams' first single not to enter the top 40. Jude Rogers from The Quietus said that the song features a vocal "that shows what his voice really can do" and that "Even a middle-eight that nods towards the trippy oompah of 'I Am the Walrus' can't change a mood that is both grand but melancholy, epic but reflective."

"Last Days of Disco" was released as a promotional single in the United States on 5 October 2010. The single featured several remixes by the artists including Roger Sanchez, Still Going, Black Van and Mighty Mouse. It peaked at number seven on the Billboard Hot Dance Club Songs chart.

== Critical reception ==
Professional ratings
Aggregate scores
Source	Rating
Metacritic	64/100
Review scores
Source	Rating
AllMusic	2/5 stars
The A.V. Club	C
Entertainment Weekly	B+
The Guardian	4/5 stars
The Independent	3/5 stars
Los Angeles Times	3/4 stars
NME	4/10
The Observer	3/5 stars
PopMatters	6/10
Spin	7/10

Reality Killed the Video Star received a varied response from music critics. One review aggregator, Metacritic, gave it an average score of 64/100 based on its sample of 17 reviews, indicating "generally favorable reviews". John Bush from AllMusic gave the album two stars out of five. He praised songs like "Bodies" and "Morning Sun" but felt that many songs "sound rushed and the performances lackluster". He concluded that the album is "not decidedly worse than 2002's Escapology, it's just bad in a different way. Whereas Escapology found Robbie disappearing into his own neuroses, this one is a hopeless mélange of satire and sincerity where, from song to song, neither can immediately be distinguished." Chris Mincher from The A.V. Club gave the album a C rating stating that: "Neurotically examining his personality quirks through decidedly unoriginal, un-quirky pop songs, Williams apparently wants to express his individuality with classic-rock reference points and frustratingly nonsensical novelty tracks."

Mark Sutherland from Billboard gave the album a favourable review. He said that it offers "string-drenched ballads, slick George Michael-style electronic dance-pop, Elvis Costello-esque clever wordplay and the slightly cheesy, supremely catchy MOR pop he made his name with." Sutherland said that "The end result may not be enough to convince America it's missing out, but expect this album to bring the already-converted back onboard in droves." Dave Karger from Entertainment Weekly gave it a B+ rating. Karger felt that although the album "contains fewer knockout potential hits than past efforts", it does feature "the two strongest soul-flecked tracks of Williams' career" in "You Know Me" and "Won't Do That", and that the singer "simply sounds fantastic with a horn section". Ben Hogwood from MusicOMH gave the album a mixed review, awarding it with three stars (out of five). He said that the "new songs reflect [a] safer maturity". Hogwood said that the album is "more like a big band version of George Michael's 'Older' than a funked-up 'Faith'" and that, although it has "a killer tune or two", the album is not exhibit the "same vitality of years ago." Talking about the production, he felt that "the orchestrations are layered on thickly in an attempt to bring some brightness to the grey." Hogwood concluded that Williams' "new found maturity suits his voice on one hand, but given his musical past it makes him a far safer proposition than he used to be."

Los Angeles Times music critic Ann Powers gave the album three stars (out of four), stating that the album is "bullishly diverse". She said that the album is "a full-body flex matching buttery ballads with laser-flecked dance tracks and arch updates from the music hall". Powers felt that the songs "showcase the nasally soulful Williams as an irresistibly smart, cosmopolitan manchild of the overly wired world." Regarding the lyrics, Powers said that Williams "focuses hard on the out-of-body experience of the everyday." She said that the production on the album is "gorgeous" and that "Williams benefits greatly from the gifts of the producer's longtime team, including the arranger Anne Dudley." Mikael Wood from Spin gave the album a 7/10 rating. He said that the album includes "cowbell-enhanced rave-up, a bit of Lady Gaga–ish electro-pop, and one track named after Transformers" and went on to call the record "a charm offensive with stars and stripes".

Slant Magazine music critic Jonathan Keefe gave the album a mixed review, rating it two and a half stars (out of five) and talked about Williams' lack of success in the United States, calling him "one of the U.S. pop market's biggest missed opportunities". Keefe felt that the album featured the sort of "heavy balladry and slick adult-pop" that made Williams' earlier records unappealing to American audiences and suggested that by "downplaying [his] formerly irrepressible charm", Reality Killed the Video Star does not do enough to reintroduce the singer to the US pop market. Andy Gill of The Independent gave the album three stars out of five, commenting that "Williams' albums have increasingly come to focus upon the singer himself, which has consequently made them less and less appealing to those not entirely smitten with his charms." This sentiment was echoed by Rosie Swash from The Observer who also gave the album three stars out of five. She said that "Reality Killed the Video Star is littered with references to his fall from grace, most of which hinge on the premise that someone or something else is truly responsible for his diminishing popularity." Swash said that "If there's a theme here it's not obvious, but it turns out Williams can be quite interesting when he moves off the topic of himself." Swash concluded that the album swings between "mawkish strings and piano overproduction" and "flashes of genuine pop frivolity".

== Commercial performance ==
In the United Kingdom, the album sold over 85,000 copies in its first day on sale and 238,125 copies in its first week, around 1,500 less than the self-titled debut album from JLS, which debuted at number one. The album had the third-highest first-week sales of 2009 in the UK, behind JLS and Susan Boyle's debut album I Dreamed a Dream, the latter of which debuted with 410,000 copies sold. In 2010 it was certified triple platinum by the British Phonographic Industry for sales of over 900,000 copies. Reality Killed the Video Star's sales week was the highest for a number-two album since James Blunt's Back to Bedlam sold 273,183 copies to claim the runners-up spot behind Eminem's Curtain Call: The Hits in December 2005. It has sold 905,469 copies as of May 2016.

Though it missed the top spot in the UK, the album debuted at number one on the European Top 100 Albums chart and spent two weeks at this position. It was certified platinum for sales of more than 1 million copies throughout Europe (which includes UK sales) by the International Federation of the Phonographic Industry. In continental Europe, the album was certified double platinum in Germany for sales of over 400,000 copies. In France, the album earned a platinum certification from the Syndicat National de l'Édition Phonographique. In Italy, the album sold over 60,000 copies and was awarded a platinum certification by the Federation of the Italian Music Industry. The album also reached the top ten in Portugal, Spain, Denmark, Norway, Finland, Sweden, and Austria.

Outside of Europe, the album reached number one in Australia and was certified platinum by the Australian Recording Industry Association for sales of 70,000 units. It also reached the top ten in New Zealand, where it was certified gold by the Recording Industry Association of New Zealand for selling more than 7,500 copies. In Latin America, the album reached the top ten in Mexico and was certified gold for shipments of 30,000 units. The album also earned a gold disc in Argentina for shipments of over 20,000 units.

== Track listing ==
All tracks produced by Trevor Horn. Additional production on "Do You Mind" by Stephen Hague.

Reality Killed the Video Star – Standard edition
No.	Title	Writer(s)	Length
1.	"Morning Sun"	Williams; Kelvin Andrews; Daniel Spencer; Richard Scott; Scott Ralph; Don Black	4:06
2.	"Bodies"	Williams; Brandon Christy; Craig Russo	4:03
3.	"You Know Me"	Williams; Andrews; Spencer; Françoise Hardy	4:21
4.	"Blasphemy"	Williams; Guy Chambers	4:19
5.	"Do You Mind"	Williams; Andrews; Spencer; Chaz Jankel	4:06
6.	"Last Days of Disco"	Williams; Andrews; Spencer	4:50
7.	"Somewhere"	Andrews; Spencer; Andy Stubbs; Jonathan Hand; Stephen Cadman	1:02
8.	"Deceptacon"	Williams; Andrews; Spencer; Scott; Ralph	5:01
9.	"Starstruck"	Williams; Andrews; Spencer; Paul Beard	5:21
10.	"Difficult for Weirdos"	Williams; Andrews; Spencer	4:29
11.	"Superblind"	Williams; Fil Eisler	4:46
12.	"Won't Do That"	Williams; Andrews; Spencer; Scott; Ralph	3:38
13.	"Morning Sun Reprise"	Williams; Andrews; Spencer; Scott; Ralph; Black	1:23
Total length:			51:30

Reality Killed the Video Star – Japanese edition bonus track
No.	Title	Writer(s)	Length
14.	"Arizona"	Williams; Andrews; Spencer	5:32
Total length:			57:02

Reality Killed the Video Star – Welt-bild edition bonus track
No.	Title	Writer(s)	Length
14.	"Bodies" (Fred Falke extended remix)	Williams; Christy; Russo	7:12
Total length:			58:33

Reality Killed the Video Star – Deluxe edition bonus DVD
No.	Title	Length
1.	"Shoot the Video Star" (Documentary)	19:00

Notes

- All physical copies of the album contain an enhanced section with links to download "Bodies – Cahill Remix" (audio) and "Cover Photoshoot" (video).
- "Bodies" is based on an original production and arrangement by Brandon Christy and Craig Russo.
- "Blasphemy" is based on an original arrangement by Guy Chambers.
- "Deceptacon", "Starstruck" and "Difficult for Weirdos" are based on original productions by Soul Mekanik.
- "Superblind" is based on an original production and arrangement by iZLER.

== Personnel ==
Performers on the album include:

- Tracy Ackerman – background vocals
- Niall Acott – string engineer
- Kelvin Andrews – programming, background vocals
- Graham Archer – programming, engineer, mixing, mixing editor
- Paul Beard – percussion, piano
- Chris Braide – background vocals
- Julian Broad – photography
- Chris Bruce – bass, guitar
- Cadman – composer
- Andy Cain – background vocals
- Brandon Christy – guitar, keyboards, programming, vocals (background)
- Chris Cowie – oboe
- Lol Creme – guitar, vocals (background)
- Anne Dudley – organ, piano, conductor, keyboards, Fender Rhodes, orchestral arrangements
- Fil Eisler – guitar, programming, vocals (background), synthesiser bass
- Sam Farr – assistant engineer
- Isaac Gaulden – vocals (background)
- Isobel Griffiths – orchestra contractor
- Stephen Hague – programming, additional production
- Edd Hartwell – assistant engineer
- Earl Harvin – drums
- Tom Hingston – art direction, design
- Trevor Horn – bass, piano, keyboards, vocals (background), producer
- Randall Jacobs – guitar
- Chaz Jankel – composer
- Luís Jardim – percussion
- Mark Lewis – engineer, assistant engineer
- Stephen Lipson – guitar
- Bob Ludwig – mastering
- Ryan Malloy – vocals (background)
- Jamie Muhoberac – organ, piano, keyboards, programming, vocals (background)
- Jeremy Murphy – assistant
- Pete Murray – organ, piano, keyboards, vibraphone, fender rhodes, Hammond B3
- Tessa Niles – vocals (background)
- Ijeoma Njaka – vocals (background)
- Chuck Norman – programming
- Robert Orton – mixing
- Phil Palmer – guitar
- Steve Price – string engineer
- Olivia Safe – vocals, soloist
- Richard Scott – harmonica
- Mary Scully – double bass
- Ash Soan – percussion, drums
- Danny Spencer – programming, vocals (background)
- Aaron Walk – assistant engineer
- Tim Weidner – programming, vocals (background), engineer, mixing
- Robbie Williams – composer, vocals.
- Bruce Wooley – vocals (background)

== Charts ==
=== Weekly charts ===
Weekly chart performance for Reality Killed the Video Star
Chart (2009)	Peak position
Argentine Albums (CAPIF)	11
Australian Albums (ARIA)	1
Austrian Albums (Ö3 Austria)	1
Belgian Albums (Ultratop Flanders)	3
Belgian Albums (Ultratop Wallonia)	2
Canadian Albums (Jam!)	57
Croatian Albums (HDU)	1
Czech Albums (IFPI)	2
Danish Albums (Hitlisten)	3
Dutch Albums (Album Top 100)	1
European Top 100 Albums (Billboard)	1
French Albums (SNEP)	2
Finnish Albums (Suomen virallinen lista)	3
German Albums (Offizielle Top 100)	1
Hungarian Albums (Mahasz)	7
Irish Albums (IRMA)	6
Italian Albums (FIMI)	2
Italian Albums (Musica e dischi)	1
Mexican Albums (AMPROFON)	6
New Zealand Albums (RMNZ)	7
Norwegian Albums (VG-lista)	6
Polish Albums (ZPAV)	12
Portuguese Albums (AFP)	7
Spanish Albums (Promusicae)	7
Swedish Albums (Sverigetopplistan)	2
Swiss Albums (Schweizer Hitparade)	1
Taiwanese Albums (Five Music)	2
UK Albums (Official Charts)	2
US Billboard 200	160

=== Year-end charts ===
2009 year-end chart performance for Reality Killed the Video Star
Chart (2009)	Position
Australian Albums (ARIA)	31
Austrian Albums (Ö3 Austria)	19
Belgian Albums (Ultratop Flanders)	90
Belgian Albums (Ultratop Wallonia)	77
Danish Albums (Hitlisten)	15
Dutch Albums (Album Top 100)	28
French Albums (SNEP)	68
German Albums (Offizielle Top 100)	18
Hungarian Albums (MAHASZ)	49
Italian Albums (FIMI)	35
Polish Albums (ZPAV)	95
Swedish Albums (Sverigetopplistan)	30
Swiss Albums (Schweizer Hitparade)	10
UK Albums (OCC)	10

2010 year-end chart performance for Reality Killed the Video Star
Chart (2010)	Position
Austrian Albums (Ö3 Austria)	32
Belgian Albums (Ultratop Flanders)	58
Belgian Albums (Ultratop Wallonia)	85
Danish Albums (Hitlisten)	74
Dutch Albums (Album Top 100)	34
European Top 100 Albums (Billboard)	8
French Albums (SNEP)	147
German Albums (Offizielle Top 100)	40
Swiss Albums (Schweizer Hitparade)	33
UK Albums (OCC)	95

== Certifications and sales ==
Region	Certification	Certified units/sales
Argentina (CAPIF)	Gold	20,000^{^}
Australia (ARIA)	Platinum	70,000^{^}
Austria (IFPI Austria)	Platinum	20,000^{*}
Belgium (BRMA)	Platinum	30,000^{*}
Chile	Platinum	10,000
Denmark (IFPI Danmark)	Platinum	30,000^{^}
Finland (Musiikkituottajat)	Gold	15,954
France (SNEP)	Platinum	100,000^{*}
Germany (BVMI)	2× Platinum	400,000^{^}
Hungary (MAHASZ)	Gold	3,000^{^}
Ireland (IRMA)	Gold	7,500^{^}
Italy (FIMI)	Platinum	70,000^{*}
Mexico (AMPROFON)	Gold	30,000^{^}
Netherlands (NVPI)	Gold	25,000^{^}
New Zealand (RMNZ)	Gold	7,500^{^}
Poland (ZPAV)	Gold	10,000^{*}
Sweden (GLF)	Gold	20,000^{‡}
Switzerland (IFPI Switzerland)	Platinum	30,000^{^}
United Kingdom (BPI)	3× Platinum	905,469
Summaries
Europe (IFPI)	Platinum	1,000,000^{*}
^{*} Sales figures based on certification alone.^{^} Shipments figures based on certification alone.^{‡} Sales+streaming figures based on certification alone.

== Release history ==
- Reality Killed the Video Star was released in three different formats: a standard 13-track CD, deluxe edition and digital download. In addition to the standard version, the deluxe edition features premium packaging and a behind-the-scenes DVD.

Region	Date	Label	Format
Germany	6 November 2009	EMI	CD, digital download
Australia	6 November 2009	EMI	CD, digital download
Austria	6 November 2009	EMI	CD, digital download
Switzerland	6 November 2009	EMI	CD, digital download
Mexico	6 November 2009	EMI	CD, digital download, CD + DVD
United Kingdom	9 November 2009	Virgin	CD, digital download, CD + DVD
France	9 November 2009	EMI	CD, digital download, CD + DVD
Spain	10 November 2009	EMI	CD, digital download
Canada	10 November 2009	EMI	CD, digital download
United States	17 November 2009	Capitol	CD, digital download
Japan	18 November 2009	EMI	CD
Brazil	24 November 2009	EMI	CD
