= Cheryl Cole's Night In =

- Cheryl Cole's Night In title card
- Presented by: Cheryl Cole; Holly Willoughby
- Starring: Alexandra Burke will.i.am Will Young; Rihanna; Snow Patrol
- Theme music composer: Steve Kipner; Wayne Wilkins; Andre Merritt
- Opening theme: "Fight for This Love" by Cheryl Cole
- Country of origin: United Kingdom

Production
- Executive producer: Michael Kelpie
- Production location: BBC Television Centre
- Running time: 44 minutes (approx.); 60 minutes (inc. breaks)
- Production company: ITV Studios

Original release
- Network: ITV
- Release: 12 December 2009

Related
- ITV Specials; The Girls Aloud Party

Cheryl Cole's Night In was a one-off television special, starring English recording artist Cheryl Cole, produced for ITV, that aired on 12 December 2009 at 6:30 pm. The programme was hosted by Holly Willoughby, featured a host of other performers and acted as a lead-in to the final of the sixth series of The X Factor, in which Cole is a judge. Cole performed songs from her debut solo album, 3 Words, and the programme also featured performances from other musical acts as well as interviews conducted by Willoughby. The programme received mixed reviews from critics and was watched by 5 million people; this is substantially less than the viewing figures of other programmes airing at the same time.

== Production ==
Tabloid newspaper The Sun published a report on 21 November 2009 claiming that Cole would receive £100,000 for appearing in a programme entitled Cheryl Cole's Night In; ITV confirmed the programme two days later, with Cole saying that she would be "working with some of [her] favourite artists". The programme was recorded through the week beginning 7 December at the BBC Television Centre and images of Cole performing the song "Fight for This Love", whilst dressed as a ninja, were released. Cole also debuted a song from her album, 3 Words, titled "Parachute", where she danced with Derek Hough, a professional champion of Dancing with the Stars.

== Setlist ==
Song	Artist	Notes
"Fight for This Love"	Cheryl Cole	Preceded by a sketch between Cole and Simon Cowell backstage at The X Factor talking about the show; then followed by an interview between Cole and presenter Holly Willoughby
"Russian Roulette"	Rihanna	Followed by a further interview between Cole and Willoughby with a behind the scenes look at the sixth series of The X Factor
"Bad Boys"	Alexandra Burke	Followed by an interview between Cole, Burke and Willoughby
"3 Words"	Cheryl Cole and will.i.am	Followed by an interview between Cole, will.i.am and Willoughby
"Leave Right Now"	Will Young	Each followed by a further interview between Cole and Willoughby
"Run"	Snow Patrol	Each followed by a further interview between Cole and Willoughby
"Parachute"	Cheryl Cole	Featured dancing accompaniment from Derek Hough

== Reception ==
Anna Pickard of The Guardian described the programme as "an hour of commissioning genius", despite Stuart Heritage of the same publication arguing that "just the title is enough to put you off". In a separate article, Heritage voiced his belief that the programme saw Cole "discussing her life in the blandest possible terms while wearing a variety of impractical dresses". Rick Fulton of the Daily Record was complimentary of the programme as he compared the dance routine that accompanied "Parachute" to a routine from the programme Strictly Come Dancing. Alexandra Burke, who featured in the programme, praised Cole by complimenting her hairstyle and by stating that her performance had "gone up another level". Sian Brewis of the Leicester Mercury was critical of the programme; she claimed that it was an "hour-long plug for Chezza's [Cole’s nickname] album", branded Willoughby's questions "vacuous" and compared Cole's costumes to that worn by characters of Street Fighter II. Rachel Holmes, writing in The Guardian, was also critical of Cole's choice of attire and argued that the programme was uninformative. Holmes also claimed that viewers "were suffering from Chezza overload" due to her appearances on The X Factor the same weekend.

The programme attracted 5 million viewers, a 22% share of the viewing audience, on its first airing. However, an episode of Merlin and an installment of the seventh series of Strictly Come Dancing, which aired at the same time on BBC One, attracted 5.2 million (25% of the audience) and 8.1 million (33%) respectively.
