= Nikola Rachelle =

British singer (born 1983)

Nikola Bedingfield
- Also known as: The Golden Phoenix; Nikola Bedingfield
- Born: Nikola Rachelle Bedingfield; 8 November 1983 (age 42); London, England
- Genres: Soul; alternative; indie pop
- Occupations: Singer; songwriter; composer
- Instrument: Vocals
- Years active: 2002–present
- Label: Indie
- Website: cargocollective.com/goldenphoenix

Nikola Rachelle Bedingfield (born 8 November 1983) is an English singer, songwriter, and composer. She has written and performed music for television, film, and advertising, including the ABC daytime drama General Hospital, the reality television series Tough Love, and Coca-Cola's "Follow the Bubble" advertising campaign. She received a Daytime Emmy Award nomination for Original Song for "Little Things", written for General Hospital.

Bedingfield is the younger sister of Daniel and Natasha Bedingfield. In addition to her work as a recording artist and songwriter, she is the founder and chief executive officer of House of Heritage, a development and coaching agency designed for artists and music entrepreneurs.

== Early life ==
Nikola Rachelle Bedingfield was born on 8 November 1983 in London, England, to John and Molly Bedingfield. She is the youngest of four children in the Bedingfield family.

When Nikola was a teenager, she and her siblings formed the dance/electronic group the DNA Algorithm. The group independently released music and performed at Christian music festivals throughout the United Kingdom before the siblings pursued separate musical careers.

== Career ==
=== Early career ===
Following the dissolution of The DNA Algorithm, Bedingfield began focusing on songwriting and developing her own solo material. She contributed backing choir vocals to Natasha Bedingfield's 2004 hit "Unwritten" and later provided vocals for David Archuleta's album The Other Side of Down.

On October 30, 2006, performing under the name Nikola Rachelle, she independently released her debut extended play, Don't Talk About This Love, exclusively through iTunes.

The title track was later covered by Cheryl for her debut solo album 3 Words. Bedingfield also co-wrote "Limbo" which recorded by JoJo for Jumping Trains.

Bedingfield has worked with a large range of writers, including Eve Nelson and Peter Kvint. Her debut album, The Golden Phoenix, was released in May 2023.

=== Songwriting and composing ===
Throughout her career, Bedingfield has collaborated with numerous songwriters and producers, including Eve Nelson, Peter Kvint, Eg White, Chris Braide, and Printz Board.

Her songwriting credits include recordings by JoJo, Jesse McCartney, CeeLo Green, Cheryl, Josh Strickland, Carly Rose Sonenclar, Brock Baker, Josiah Bell, Paul Wright, Shane Stevens, Megan Nicole, Natasha Bedingfield, and others.

In addition to commercial recordings, Bedingfield has composed music for television and advertising. Her work has appeared in ABC's General Hospital, VH1's Tough Love, and Coca-Cola's international "Follow the Bubble advertising campaign, which ran in the early 2010s.

=== Debut album ===
In May 2023, Nikola released her debut studio album Golden Phoenix, under the name Nikola Bedingfield.

=== Business career ===
Bedingfield is the founder and chief executive officer of House of Heritage, an artist development and coaching agency serving a diverse clientele of musicians, songwriters, producers, and creative industry professionals.

=== Musical style ===
Bedingfield's music incorporates elements of soul, alternative pop, indie pop, folk, and electronic music. As both a recording artist and songwriter, she has worked across pop, R&B, dance, television scoring, and commercial music.

== Discography ==
=== Studio albums ===
- Golden Phoenix (2023) (as Nikola Bedingfield)

=== Extended plays ===
- Don't Talk About This Love (2006) (as Nikola Rachelle)

=== Songwriting credits ===
- "Battleships"
- "The Coca-Cola Song" (a.k.a. "Follow the Bubble")
- "Don't Talk About This Love"
- "Purple Hearts (Soldier of Love)" – CeeLo Green
- "Forest Fire"
- "Foxy"
- "Hero's and Fools"
- "In Your Arms"
- "Loved by You"
- "The Man from Venezuela"
- "Night Before"
- "Phoenix"
- "Promised Land"
- "Sirens"
- "Soldier On"
- "Strings of Gold"
- "Take Me Home"
- "Turn Me On, Turn Me Up"
- "Your Eyes"
- "How Now Brown Cow"
- "Sticks and Stones" (a.k.a. "Freedom from You")
- "The Best Sex" – Printz Board feat. Nikola Bedingfield
- "Faith Over Fear" – Dave Kull feat. Nikola Rachelle
- "Vagabonds" – Grizfolk
- "Reaching" – Zhu feat. Nikola Bedingfield (uncredited)
- "Best Time Ever" – Printz Board
- "Bullet" – Erika Heynatz
- "Clueless" - Megan Nicole
- "Don't Talk About This Love" – Cheryl
- "Fighters" – Carly Rose Sonenclar
- "F'NA" – Printz Board
- "Give It Back" – Hennessy
- "I Just Wanna Love You" – Printz Board
- "If I Get an Encore" – Christy Moore
- "Illusion" – Josh Strickland
- "Last Dance" – Jake Austin Walker
- "Love, Love, Love" – Printz Board
- "Limbo" – JoJo
- "Messed Up" – Josiah Bell
- "On My Way to You" – Hennessy
- "Reaching" – Zhu
- "Superbad" – Jesse McCartney
- "Supernova" – Bartholomew
- "Take Your Mind Off It" – Brock Baker
- "Tempted By Your Touch" – Joana Zimmer
- "What It Do" – Printz Board
- "World Gone Crazy" – Shane Stevens
- "You're Beautiful" – Paul Wright
- "Your Hand" – Josiah Bell
- "Young n Stupid" – Brock Baker

== Awards and nominations ==
Year	Award	Work	Result
2015	Daytime Emmy Award -- Outstanding Original Song	"Little Things" (General Hospital)	Nominated
