= Morning Sun (Robbie Williams song) =

Single by Robbie Williams

from the album Reality Killed the Video Star
- B-side: "Elastik"
- Released: 8 March 2010
- Recorded: June 2009; London, United Kingdom
- Genre: Pop rock
- Length: 4:06 (album version); 3:50 (radio edit); 3:55 (music video)
- Label: EMI
- Songwriters: Robbie Williams; Don Black; Kelvin Andrews; Daniel Spencer; Richard Scott; Scott Ralph
- Producer: Trevor Horn

Robbie Williams singles chronology
"You Know Me" (2009)	"Morning Sun" (2010)	"Shame" (2010)

Music video
- "Morning Sun" on YouTube

"Morning Sun" is the third and final official single from British singer-songwriter Robbie Williams' eighth studio album, Reality Killed the Video Star. It was released on 8 March 2010, and it is the official charity single for Sport Relief 2010. Written around the time of pop star Michael Jackson's death, the song was originally meant to be a tribute to the late star, co-written by Don Black who wrote Jackson's 1972 song "Ben". However, Williams later commented that it was more about himself. The phrase "morning sun" has a connection to Jackson; used as a lyric both in The Jackson 5 1970 song, "Can I See You in the Morning?" and "Baby Be Mine" from the album Thriller (1982).

== Background and composition ==
"Morning Sun" was initially penned for Williams by Richard Scott and Scott Ralph, Williams tried to re-write some of the lyrics to fit towards a perspective of his own interpretation. The Death of Michael Jackson helped Williams overcome writer's block. According to Chris Heath's 2017 Williams biography, Reveal: Robbie Williams, the song was inspired by an affinity Williams had with Jackson and prescription drugs: "[That] hit me", Williams stated: "And how close I must have come to being in the same place. And that scared me".

== Music video ==
The music video for the single was directed by Vaughan Arnell and filmed at Universal Studios Hollywood. It shows Williams as an astronaut on a mission in the International Space Station.

== Critical reception ==
UK website Digital Spy gave the song three stars out of five and commented that: "[Morning Sun] is a bit like something from mid-'90s Britpoppers Electrasy – a straightforward trad-rock song complete with metronomic piano chords, swooning strings and the rest. Two minutes in, it gets close enough to 'I Am the Walrus' for George Martin to consider giving his lawyer a bell. Sure, it's the most adventurous release of Williams's career, but it's pleasant to its bones and the lyrics have just enough about them to avoid the trap of self-regarding introspection that marred the likes of 'Strong' and 'Come Undone' in the past."

== Promotion ==
Williams performed the song on 23 January 2010 at the NRJ Music Awards where he also received two awards for International Male Artist of the Year and the NRJ Award of Honour. "Morning Sun" was performed on 13 February 2010 (Williams' 36th birthday) on the UK TV show So You Think You Can Dance. The song was also performed as part of a greatest hits medley at the 2010 Brit Awards where Williams won the prestigious Outstanding Contribution to Music Award on 16 February. "Morning Sun" was performed by Williams at the 2010 Echo Awards in Berlin on 4 March, where he won the award for Best International Male Artist. He performed the single yet again on appeal night for Sport Relief 2010.

== Track listing ==
International CD single

1. "Morning Sun" (radio edit) – 3:50
2. "Elastik" – 4:37

Digital EP

1. "Morning Sun" (album version) – 4:03
2. "Morning Sun" (Live from BBC Electric Proms) – 3:57
3. "Elastik" – 4:37

== Charts ==
=== Weekly charts ===
Chart (2010)	Peak position
Austria (Ö3 Austria Top 40)	57
Belgium (Ultratip Bubbling Under Flanders)	12
Belgium (Ultratop 50 Wallonia)	27
CIS Airplay (TopHit)	117
Europe (European Hit Radio)	10
Finland Airplay (Radiosoittolista)	14
Germany (Gfk)	32
Hungary (Rádiós Top 40)	27
Italy (Musica e dischi)	32
Netherlands (Single Top 100)	75
UK Singles (OCC)	45
UK Airplay (Music Week)	2

=== Year-end charts ===
Chart (2010)	Peak position
Italy Airplay (EarOne)	48
