= 3 Words =

Studio album by Cheryl Cole
- Released: 23 October 2009
- Recorded: April–August 2009
- Studios: Henson Recording Studios; Record Plant Studios; SubZero Studios; Metropolis Studios; My AutoTonic Studios; Brown Sugar Studios
- Genres: Dance-pop; R&B
- Length: 43:55
- Labels: Fascination; Polydor
- Producers: will.i.am; Taio Cruz; Soulshock & Karlin; Steve Kipner; Fraser T Smith; Syience; Sam Watters; Wayne Wilkins

Cheryl Cole chronology
| 3 Words (2009) | Messy Little Raindrops (2010) |

Singles from 3 Words
- 1. "Fight for This Love" Released: 16 October 2009; 2. "3 Words" Released: 20 December 2009; 3. "Parachute" Released: 11 March 2010

3 Words is the debut studio album by English singer Cheryl Cole released on 23 October 2009 by Fascination Records. Cole's first solo performance was on American rapper will.i.am's "Heartbreaker" (2008), on which she sang additional vocals. Following this, it was announced that Cole's band Girls Aloud would take a break from releasing material, having enjoyed five successful albums and twenty consecutive top-ten singles. In April 2009, Cole started working on solo material in Los Angeles and London, mainly collaborating with will.i.am, who served as executive producer of the album.

The album was released to commercial and critical success. The album debuted at number one on the UK Albums Chart, selling 125,271 copies in its first week. The album also made appearances on the Irish, Australian and Swiss charts. In the UK the album was certified three times Platinum by the British Phonographic Industry and has since sold 1,000,000 copies in the country alone.

Upon its release, 3 Words received positive reviews from music critics, who commended its production, lyrics and themes. The album spawned three singles—"Fight for This Love", the title song and "Parachute"—with the lead single becoming the fastest-selling single of 2009 in the UK and peaking at number one in Ireland, Denmark, Norway, Hungary and the UK. 3 Words is Cole's most successful album to date.

== Background ==
Cole's first foray into a solo music career occurred in 2007 when she featured on will.i.am's "Heartbreaker". After having street dancing lessons during the filming of the ITV2 series Passions of Girls Aloud, Cole was picked to appear in the song's video. She was later asked to sing the female vocals on the UK release of the track. Cole's version is featured on her album as it was not featured on will.i.am's album Songs About Girls.

== Recording ==
It was confirmed on 27 April 2009 via MTV UK that Cole would be working on solo material. Cole reunited with will.i.am, and also worked with Syience, Taio Cruz, and Wayne Wilkins. Cruz was asked to write two songs for Cole, the first of which, "Break Your Heart", was written specially for Cole but Polydor label boss Ferdy Unger-Hamilton felt the song was too similar to "Heartbreaker", the track Cole did with will.i.am. Cruz reclaimed the song and released it as the lead single from his second album, Rokstarr. The song went on to reach number 1 on the UK Singles Chart and on the US Billboard Hot 100. The other song, "Stand Up", did make the album. The album begins with its title track, a duet with will.i.am and Cole's favourite song on the album. She said the song was "totally different from anything I've done [with Girls Aloud] or liked before" and took its inspiration from Cole's newly acquired love for dance music on the charts, especially David Guetta and Kelly Rowland's "When Love Takes Over". "Parachute", written by singer-songwriter Ingrid Michaelson and Marshall Altman with production from Syience, was described by Cole as "left-of-field" and "unique". She cited "you are your own worst enemy, you'll never win the fight" as her favourite lyric from the album. Cole also noted that it was a contender for the album's lead single. "Heaven", another will.i.am production, was the first song to be co-written and recorded by Cole for 3 Words and for that reason holds "a special meaning" to her. It contains a sample of "Is You" by D.I.M., written by Andreas Meid.

Cole revealed that the lead single, "Fight for This Love", came to her in demo form with a male vocalist. Cole said she "knew instantly it was a single", having "connected with the song so well". "Rain on Me", co-written by prolific American songwriters Sam Watters and Louis Biancaniello, was one of the last songs to be recorded for 3 Words. Cole recorded the song in Los Angeles and said the process was "emotional" as the album's recording was coming to an end. "Make Me Cry" was the first song that Cole recorded with will.i.am in Los Angeles. Cole wrote verses around will.i.am's hook, which was inspired by his girlfriend. Cole said that she listened to the demo of "Happy Hour", initially titled "Sweet and Sour", on repeat because she enjoyed the song so much. She further noted that the song, produced by Soulshock & Karlin, had a "60s sound" and was "one of those tracks that you either really love or you don't get it." It interpolates elements of Renaldo Domino's "Nevermore", written by Richard Pegue.

"Stand Up" was written and produced by Taio Cruz and Fraser T Smith. Smith claims that during one day he and Cruz wrote the rejected "Break Your Heart" in the morning and "Stand Up" in the afternoon. Cruz described the song as an "absolute club banger". The song features an uncredited rap by Cruz, which was originally not present. Cole said it was "one of those instant tracks that make you feel good". "Stand Up" references the "bop bop" sung melody from Duran Duran's "Planet Earth". "Don't Talk About This Love" was written by songwriter/producer Chris Braide and Nikola Bedingfield, the younger sister of singers Daniel and Natasha Bedingfield. It was originally recorded by Nikola Bedingfield as the title track for her debut EP. Cole's A&R at Polydor had remembered the track and suggested she record it with Braide at his studio. Cole was attracted to the song for its lyrics and vibe, saying it "felt right". In an interview with HitQuarters Braide said, "[It's a] very emotional song. She said to me, 'I really relate to this.' And I don't know if it had something to do with her personal situation at the time, but ..." "Boy Like You", featuring and produced by will.i.am, samples Fleetwood Mac's 1987 single "Little Lies", which initially attracted Cole to the song. Cheryl wanted to take the Fleetwood Mac sample and create something current and modern with it. The album also features the clean single version of will.i.am's "Heartbreaker", for which Cole provides the female vocals.

== Music and lyrics ==
Thematically 3 Words revolves around the complexities of relationships and love, with Cole singing about finding, winning, embracing and losing love. The album's lyrics follow an autobiographical subtext in which most of the songs deal with her overcoming her tribulations. Andy Gill of The Independent described the album's lyrics as showing that the "path to romantic fulfillment is pock-marked with treachery, uncertainty and secrecy". Lyrics on some of the songs have a "deeper undertow of paranoia" such as "Parachute", "Make Me Cry" and "Don't Talk About This Love", which Gill described as being "a fear that others are bent on destroying her relationship, so 'the less they know, the less they judge'."

3 Words is a dance-pop and R&B album that explores a variety of genres including modern pop with elements of '90s throwback music. The album's production is characterised as being "restrained" in its arrangements with heavy beats built over "light piano-style motifs and acoustic guitar elements", according to Mike Diver of the BBC.

== Release and promotion ==
When asked about the album's title Cole revealed she had already contemplated an album title which contained the phrase 3 Words before the title track was recorded. The cover shows the singer bare-shouldered, looking over her shoulder in a veiled and be-flowered headpiece, the album's title tattooed on her skin. Knight said, "although she is photographed all the time by the paparazzi, she is not in front of the camera for a shoot in the same way as professional models are – she is less used to the process." He continued, "Cheryl was great to work with, though [...] – it is just a different kind of shoot with a model who is experienced."

Cole performed the lead single on the X Factor live results show for the first time. The show, which also featured the first UK performance by Whitney Houston in six years, drew a record audience of 14.8 million, making it the most watched episode in the show's history at that time. Cole also taped a performance for UK teen channel T4, which aired 15 November 2009. Cole appeared at Children in Need Rocks the Royal Albert Hall on 12 November 2009 to perform "Fight for This Love" in a white version of her X Factor performance outfit and later returning to perform Snow Patrol's single "Set the Fire to the Third Bar" with Gary Lightbody.

In December ITV1 aired a one-off television special titled Cheryl Cole's Night In, presented by Holly Willoughby. Then on 16 February, Cole appeared at the 2010 BRIT Awards for a performance which began with Cole being "catapulted" on stage with her dancers.

Cole performed "3 Words" for the first time with will.i.am during her one-off special for ITV, Cheryl Cole's Night In. In January 2010, Cole flew to Germany to perform "3 Words" at the German award ceremony DLD Starnight, which took place at the Haus der Kunst in Munich. She also performed the song as part of a four-song set at BBC Radio 1's Big Weekend as well as performing at the De Grisogono jewellery dinner party at the Eden Rock Hotel in Cap d'Antibes during the Cannes Film Festival.

Cole debuted "Parachute" during the television special Cheryl Cole's Night In, which was broadcast on 12 December 2009 on ITV1. Cole was due to perform the track on Friday Night with Jonathan Ross on Friday 12 March 2010 and on the BBC Radio 1's Live Lounge, however, she pulled out after contracting bronchitis. "Parachute" was performed live on Sport Relief on 19 March 2010. On 23 March 2010, Cole rescheduled her performance of the Live Lounge, where she performed "Parachute", as well as a cover of Owl City's "Fireflies".

== Commercial performance ==
The first single from the album, "Fight for This Love", was written by Andre Merritt, Steve Kipner and Wayne Wilkins, and produced by Steve Kipner and Wayne Wilkins. According to Cole, it was released as the lead single because she "connected with the song so well". Following a performance on The X Factor live results show, "Fight for This Love" became the fourth best-selling single of 2009 in the UK. It charted at number one on both the Irish and UK Singles Chart. In 2010, "Fight for This Love" went to number one in Denmark, Norway and Hungary. The single was later certified platinum in the UK. Cole's second single "3 Words", which features will.i.am, was certified silver and went to number four in the UK and seven in Ireland. In 2010, the single was released in Australia, peaking at number five and being certified platinum. The third single, "Parachute", charted in the top five in both the UK and Ireland. The single was certified gold in the UK. A number of songs appeared in the lower regions of the chart following the album's release.

== Critical reception ==
Professional ratings
Aggregate scores
| Source | Rating |
|---|---|
| Metacritic | 62/100 |
Review scores
| Source | Rating |
| AllMusic | 2.5/5 stars |
| Attitude | 4/5 stars |
| Daily Telegraph | 2/5 stars |
| Digital Spy | 3/5 stars |
| The Guardian | 3/5 stars |
| The Independent | 2/5 stars |
| musicOMH | 2/5 stars |
| Nu.nl | 8/10 stars |
| The Times | 2/5 stars |

3 Words received generally favourable reviews from contemporary pop music critics, earning a rating of 62 out of 100 on Metacritic based on 6 reviews. The Guardian gave the album three stars out of five but felt it was "ultimately too tentative and slight to be more than a footnote in Cheryl's unstoppable celebrity story". Tom Ewing argues, "Parts of this album never pass beyond conservative pleasantries. But the shift in sound was still necessary." The review further described 3 Words as "a low-key, shadowy kind of pop record, whose best songs rarely take immediate hold". Gay magazine Attitude agreed, stating that although guarded "introduces us to Cheryl as an individual – the girl behind the gloss. Very hip, very now, and ultimately very Cheryl." Irish fortnightly Hot Press said "the People's Princess pleases with Her catchy generic pop". BBC Music gave the album a mixed review, but noted it "does exceed pessimistic predictions".

The album was criticised in comparison to Cole's work with Girls Aloud. Digital Spy said the album was "not a bad record, but nor is it a modern pop classic to rival the best Girls Aloud albums [...] it's a collection of cool, contemporary pop-R&B tunes that takes a few plays to reveal its charms." The Daily Telegraph described the album as a "selection of sexy but underwhelming R'n'B pop", noting that there was "not a hint of the bubbly personality that has won over X Factor viewers" or "the electro-guitar fusion that put Girls Aloud on top". Financial Times also called it a "dismayingly boring solo album, [...] swapping Girls Aloud's sparkly pop for thin R&B-flavoured songs with dreary beats and characterless singing." Pete Paphides of The Times agreed that Cheryl's personality is "absent from mid-paced fillers" and exclaimed that "even when 3 Words gives you something to admire, the emotional temperature rarely nudges above frosty." The Independent further stated the album was "utterly bereft of imagination and risk, with tried and tested R&B producers [...] doing what they do as dispassionately as possible." Pierre Oitmann of Dutch news site Nu.nl pointed out "the album is mostly being characterised by strong A&R management; i.e. thoroughly sought together songs and consistent production values", before concluding "Cheryl's role is reduced almost entirely to 'hot chick' on the cover."

== Track listing ==
3 Words track listing
| No. | Title | Writer(s) | Producer(s) | Length |
|---|---|---|---|---|
| 1. | "3 Words" (featuring will.i.am) | William Adams; Cheryl Cole; George Pajon | will.i.am | 4:33 |
| 2. | "Parachute" | Ingrid Michaelson; Marshall Altman | Syience | 3:40 |
| 3. | "Heaven" (featuring will.i.am) | Adams; Cole; Stacy Barthe | will.i.am | 4:37 |
| 4. | "Fight for This Love" | Steve Kipner; Wayne Wilkins; Andre Merrit | Wilkins; Kipner | 3:43 |
| 5. | "Rain on Me" | Kipner; Sam Watters; Wilkins; Olivia Waithe; Louis Biancaniello | Wilkins; Watters | 3:50 |
| 6. | "Make Me Cry" | Adams; Cole; Caleb Speir | will.i.am | 4:35 |
| 7. | "Happy Hour" | C. Schack; K. Karlin; Priscilla Renea | Soulshock and Karlin | 4:06 |
| 8. | "Stand Up" | Fraser T. Smith; Taio Cruz | Smith; Cruz | 3:24 |
| 9. | "Don't Talk About This Love" | Chris Braide; Nikola Rachelle | Syience | 3:45 |
| 10. | "Boy Like You" (featuring will.i.am) | Adams; Cole | will.i.am | 4:27 |
| 11. | "Heartbreaker" (will.i.am featuring Cheryl Cole) | Adams | will.i.am | 3:15 |
| Total length: | | | | 43:49 |

iTunes Store bonus video
| No. | Title | Length |
|---|---|---|
| 12. | "Fight for This Love" (music video) |

International iTunes Store edition
| No. | Title | Writer(s) | Producer(s) | Length |
|---|---|---|---|---|
| 12. | "3 Words" (album track-by-track) | | | 10:10 |
| 13. | "Fight for This Love" (Moto Blanco Club Mix) | Kipner; Wilkins; Merrit | Wilkins; Kipner; Sunship | 7:28 |
| Total length: | | | | 61:27 |

2010 Mexican and 2015 US digital bonus track
| No. | Title | Writer(s) | Producer(s) | Length |
|---|---|---|---|---|
| 12. | "Fight for This Love" (Sunship Old Skool UK Garage Remix) | Kipner; Wilkins; Merrit | Wilkins; Kipner; Sunship | 5:01 |
| Total length: | | | | 48:50 |

Sample credits

- "Heaven" contains samples from "Is You" by D.I.M., written by Andreas Meid.
- "Happy Hour" contains samples from "Nevermore" by Renaldo Domino, written by Richard Pegue.
- "Boy like You" contains samples from "Little Lies" by Fleetwood Mac, written by Christine McVie and Eddy Quintela.

=== 3 Words – The B-Sides EP ===
A digital EP featuring the three B-sides to the three singles from the 3 Words album, titled 3 Words – The B-Sides EP, was released online on 18 April 2010 from Fascination Records.

| No. | Title | Writer(s) | Producer(s) | Length |
|---|---|---|---|---|
| 1. | "Didn't I" | Andrea Remanda; Cole; Klaus Derendorf | Klaus D | 3:47 |
| 2. | "Boys" | Emeli Sandé; James Murray; Mustafa Omer; Shahid Khan | Smith | 3:41 |
| 3. | "Just Let Me Go" | Claude Kelly; Reggie Perry | Syience | 3:04 |

== Personnel ==
- Cheryl Cole – lead vocals, co-writer
- William "will.i.am" Adams – executive producer, featured vocals, background vocals, producer, arrange, mixing, Instrumentation, co-writer
- Taio Cruz – producer, featured vocals, instrumentation, co-writer
- Priscilla Renea – co-writer, background vocals
- Louis Biancaniello – instrumentation
- Carsten Schack, Kenneth Karlin (Soulshock & Karlin) – producers, arrangement, instrumentation, mixing
- Steve Kipner – producer, arrangement
- Nick Knight – photographer
- Reggie "Syience" Perry – producer, arrangement
- Fraser T Smith – producer, instrumentation
- Samual "Sam" Watters – producer
- Wayne Wilkins – producer, arrangement, mixing
- Tom Coyne – mastering
- Mikaelin 'Blue' Bluespruce – recording engineer

== Charts ==
The album debuted at number one in the UK with sales of 125,271. It then retained the number 1 position for another week. On 6 November 2009 the British Phonographic Industry (BPI) certified the album platinum. It has since gone 3× Platinum, with sales of over 1,000,000 copies.

=== Weekly charts ===
Weekly chart performance for 3 Words
| Chart (2009–2010) | Peak position |
|---|---|
| Australian Albums (ARIA) | 31 |
| Austrian Albums (Ö3 Austria) | 26 |
| Belgian Albums (Ultratop Flanders) | 99 |
| Belgian Albums (Ultratop Wallonia) | 96 |
| Dutch Albums (Album Top 100) | 49 |
| European Top 100 Albums (Billboard) | 7 |
| French Albums (SNEP) | 53 |
| German Albums (Offizielle Top 100) | 45 |
| Greece Albums (IFPI Greece) | 15 |
| Irish Albums (IRMA) | 2 |
| Italian Albums (FIMI) | 56 |
| Norwegian Albums (VG-lista) | 18 |
| Scottish Albums (Official Charts) | 2 |
| South Korean Albums (Gaon) | 5 |
| Spanish Albums (Promusicae) | 64 |
| Swedish Albums (Sverigetopplistan) | 42 |
| Swiss Albums (Schweizer Hitparade) | 52 |
| UK Albums (Official Charts) | 1 |

=== Year-end charts ===
Year-end chart performance for 3 Words
| Chart (2009) | Position |
|---|---|
| Irish Albums Chart | 23 |
| UK Albums Chart | 11 |
| Chart (2010) | Position |
| European Top 100 Albums (Billboard) | 52 |
| UK Albums Chart | 37 |

== Certifications ==
Certifications for 3 Words
| Region | Certification | Certified units/sales |
|---|---|---|
| Ireland (IRMA) | 2× Platinum | 30,000^{^} |
| United Kingdom (BPI) | 3× Platinum | 900,000^{^} |
Summaries
| Europe (IFPI) | Platinum | 1,000,000^{*} |
^{*} Sales figures based on certification alone.^{^} Shipments figures based on certification alone.

== Release history ==
Release history and formats for 3 Words
| Region | Release date | Format | Label | Catalogue |
|---|---|---|---|---|
| Ireland | 23 October 2009 | CD, digital download | Polydor | 2721459 |
| United Kingdom | 26 October 2009 | CD, digital download | Fascination | 2721459 |
| Italy | 12 February 2010 | CD, digital download | Universal Music | 060252732483 |
| Netherlands | 12 February 2010 | CD, digital download | Universal Music | 0602527324838 |
| Switzerland | 12 February 2010 | CD, digital download | Universal Music | 0602527324838 |
| Portugal | 15 February 2010 | CD, digital download | Universal Music | 0602527324838 |
| Russia | 15 February 2010 | CD, digital download | Universal Music | |
| Mexico | 16 March 2010 | CD, digital download | Universal Music | 602527324838 |
| Brazil | 16 March 2010 | CD, digital download | Universal Music | 602527324838 |
| Germany | 19 March 2010 | CD, digital download | Universal Music | 0602527214597 |
| France | 22 March 2010 | CD, digital download | Universal Music | 0602527214597 |
| Australia | 9 April 2010 | CD, digital download | Universal Music | 0602527324838 |
| Denmark | 17 May 2010 | Digital download | Universal Music | 0602527214597 |
| United States | 10 July 2015 | Digital download | Universal Music | |

== See also ==
- List of 2009 albums
- List of UK Albums Chart number ones of the 2000s
