= Sport Relief 2010 =

- Genre: Telethon
- Presented by: Gary Lineker; Christine Bleakley; Richard Hammond; Claudia Winkleman; Davina McCall; James Corden; Fearne Cotton; Patrick Kielty
- Country of origin: United Kingdom

Production
- Executive producer: Richard Curtis
- Production location: BBC Television Centre
- Camera setup: Multiple
- Running time: various times

Original release
- Network: BBC One, BBC Two
- Release: 19 March – 20 March 2010

Related
- Sport Relief 2008; Sport Relief 2012; Let's Dance for Sport Relief; Comic Relief Does The Apprentice

Sport Relief 2010, was a fund raising event organised by Sport Relief, broadcast live on BBC One and BBC Two from the evening of 19 March 2010 to early the following morning. It was held on Friday 19 March and Saturday 20 March 2010 from 7:00pm to 1:30am at the BBC Television Centre.

== Presenters ==
| Time | Presenters |
|---|---|
| 19.00-20.25 | Christine Bleakley and Gary Lineker |
| 20.25-22.00 | Richard Hammond and Claudia Winkleman |
| 22.00-22.35 (BBC Two) | Richard Hammond and Claudia Winkleman |
| 22.35-00.05 | James Corden and Davina McCall |
| 00:05-01.30 | Fearne Cotton and Patrick Kielty |

== Donation Progress ==
| Time | Amount | Large Donations |
|---|---|---|
| 20:20 | £4,838,679 | Christine Bleakley Water Ski Challenge – £1,321,623 |
| 21:57 | £16,262,541 | Eddie Izzard's marathon runs – £1,152,510 |
| 00:05 | £26,492,042 | The BT Sport Relief Million Pound Bike Ride – £1,337,099 |
| 01:30 | £29,323,818 | - |
| 17:32 | £31,633,091 | - |

- According to the official site £44,250,251 has been raised as of January 2011.

== Sketches ==
| Title | Brief Description | Starring |
|---|---|---|
| Walk on the Wild Side | A special version of the show. | Standard cast |
| Match of the Day, does MasterChef | A special version of the show. | Gary Lineker, Alan Hansen, Mark Lawrenson, Gregg Wallace and John Torode |
| A Question of Sport Relief | A special episode of the sport panel show. | Frank Skinner, Sue Barker, Paddy McGuinness, David Ginola, Jason Manford, Chris Hollins and Zara Phillips. |
| A Question of Sport Relief – Too Hot for TV | Outtakes from A Question of Sport Relief | Frank Skinner, Sue Barker, Paddy McGuinness, David Ginola, Jason Manford, Chris Hollins and Zara Phillips. |
| Outnumbered | A Special Sport Relief edition. | Standard cast, without Tyger Drew-Honey or Claire Skinner |
| The One Show | A spoof episode courtesy of Culshaw and Stephenson. | Jon Culshaw, Debra Stephenson, Adrian Chiles, Christine Bleakley and David Haye. |
| Let's Dance for Sport Relief | A special dancing montage. | Rufus Hound. |
| Dragons' Den does Strictly Come Dancing | Dragon's Duncan Bannatyne and Peter Jones battle it out to become the Dancing Champion. | Peter Jones, Duncan Bannatyne, Tess Daly, Bruno Tonioli, Len Goodman and Craig Revel Horwood. |
| The Choir does Sport Relief | Gareth Malone gathers and trains Olympic and Paralympic Athletes to form The Sport Relief Choir. | Gareth Malone and others to be announced |
| Ashes to Ashes | DCI Gene Hunt substitutes his car for a golf cart as he and his partner in crime investigate a missing trophy with several sporting legends as suspects. | Philip Glenister, Keeley Hawes and Michael Parkinson |
| Smithy wins Coach of the Year | Smithy from Gavin & Stacey accepts an award at the Sports Personality of the Year. Shown twice in the broadcast. | James Corden, Tom Daley, Jenson Button, Freddie Flintoff, Andy Murray, Manchester United Football Team and David Beckham |
| Mock the Week | Special edition of the panelist show. | Dara Ó Briain, Andy Parsons, Russell Howard, Hugh Dennis, Chris Addison, Ed Byrne, and Kevin Bridges. |
| Katy Brand | Katy Brand has a very special sketch in which she takes on boxer Joe Calzaghe. Not shown due to issues. | Katy Brand, and Joe Calzaghe. |
| Sport Relief Does Dragon's Den | Members of the public put forward their sporting ideas towards to the Dragons with help from some special stars. | Ruby Wax, James Cracknell, Greg Rusedski, James Caan, Peter Jones, Duncan Bannatyne, Theo Paphitis and Deborah Meaden. |
| Behind the Scenes of Smithy | A look at how the Smithy Sketch was made. Shown twice during the broadcast | James Corden |
| Invictus II | Stephen K. Amos as Nelson Mandela meets the England Rugby Team | Stephen K. Amos and The England Rugby Team |

== Musical Performances ==
| Artist | Song | Notes |
|---|---|---|
| Robbie Williams | "Feel" | |
| Cheryl Cole | "Parachute" | |
| Lemar Feat. JLS | "What About Love" | |
| Robbie Williams | "Morning Sun" | The official Sport Relief song for this year. |
| Susan Boyle | "Wild Horses" | Pre Recorded |
| Annie Lennox | "Bridge Over Troubled Water" | |

== Trivia ==
During the opening credits of the show the music provided was AC/DC's "Back in Black".
