= You Know Me (Robbie Williams song) =

Single by Robbie Williams

from the album Reality Killed the Video Star
- Released: 23 October 2009
- Recorded: 2008–2009 (London, United Kingdom)
- Genre: Blues rock
- Length: 4:21 (album version); 3:50 (radio edit); 4:30 (music video)
- Label: EMI
- Songwriters: Robbie Williams; Candy Flip; Kelvin Andrews; Daniel Spencer; Françoise Hardy
- Producer: Trevor Horn

Robbie Williams singles chronology
"Bodies" (2009)	"You Know Me" (2009)	"Morning Sun" (2010)

Music video
- "You Know Me" on YouTube

"You Know Me" is the second official single from British singer-songwriter Robbie Williams' eighth studio album Reality Killed the Video Star. The song was released on 4 December 2009. It is based on an original song "Voilà" written by French artist Françoise Hardy. Williams performed the song during his BBC Electric Proms concert on 20 October 2009. Ken Bruce premiered the song on BBC Radio 2 during his show on 23 October.

== Critical reception ==
UK website Digital Spy gave the song four stars (out of five) commenting that: "'You Know Me', a single whose very title seems to be cosying up to all those fans he's neglected in recent years – just the sort of fans who are likely to enjoy this tune. Borrowing sufficiently from Françoise Hardy's 'Voila' to earn the chanteuse a co-writing credit, it's a classic Robbie ballad with lashings of strings, 'shoo-ba-ba' backing vocals and a lovely, timeless-sounding chorus melody."

== Music video ==
The music video for the song was released on Williams' official website on 6 November 2009. In the video Robbie Williams falls asleep and wakes up dressed as a rabbit in a waistcoat, exploring a fantasy world that seems to be based on Alice in Wonderland. After he finishes exploring the fantasy world he dances with a group of women also dressed as rabbits; however, this time he is wearing make-up to complete his transformation. The video was directed by Phil & Olly (also known as Diamond Dogs) and filmed at Shepperton Studios.

== Track listing ==
UK CD single

1. "You Know Me" – 4:21
2. "Bodies" (Aeroplane Remix) – 6:42

Digital EP

1. "You Know Me" – 4:21
2. "You Know Me" (The Count & Sinden Remix) – 4:58
3. "You Know Me" (The Count & Sinden Dubble Bubble Remix) – 4:15

== Charts ==
=== Weekly charts ===
Weekly chart performance for "You Know Me"
Chart (2009–2010)	Peak position
Australia (ARIA)	33
Austria (Ö3 Austria Top 40)	25
Belgium (Ultratop 50 Flanders)	17
Belgium (Ultratop 50 Wallonia)	31
CIS Airplay (TopHit)	125
Denmark (Tracklisten)	12
Europe (European Hot 100)	15
Europe (European Hit Radio)	6
Germany (GfK)	26
Hungary (Editors' Choice Top 40)	14
Ireland (IRMA)	22
Italy (FIMI)	20
Italy (Musica e dischi)	7
Italy Airplay (EarOne)	5
Netherlands (Dutch Top 40)	10
Spain (Promusicae)	22
Spain Airplay (PROMUSICAE)	7
Sweden (Sverigetopplistan)	35
Switzerland (Schweizer Hitparade)	51
UK Singles (Official Charts)	6
UK Airplay (Music Week)	1

=== Year-end charts ===
2009 year-end chart performance for "You Know Me"
Chart (2009)	Peak position
Taiwan (Hito Radio)	95
UK Singles (OCC)	101

2010 year-end chart performance for "You Know Me"
Chart (2010)	Peak position
Europe (European Hot 100)	97
Italy Airplay (EarOne)	78

== Certifications ==
Certifications for "You Know Me"
Region	Certification	Certified units/sales
United Kingdom (BPI)	Silver	200,000^{^}
^{^} Shipments figures based on certification alone.

== Release history ==
Country	Release date	Format	Label
United Kingdom	23 October 2009	Airplay	Virgin, EMI
United Kingdom	7 December 2009	CD single, digital download	Virgin, EMI
Australia	28 November 2009	Digital download	Chrysalis, EMI
Austria	4 December 2009	CD single	Chrysalis, EMI
Germany	4 December 2009	CD single	Chrysalis, EMI
Switzerland	4 December 2009	CD single	Chrysalis, EMI
Mexico	8 December 2009	Digital download	EMI
