= Bodies (Robbie Williams song) =

2009 single by Robbie Williams

Single by Robbie Williams

from the album Reality Killed the Video Star
- Released: 4 September 2009
- Recorded: 2008–2009 (London, United Kingdom)
- Genre: Pop rock; synthpop
- Length: 4:03 (album version); 4:14 (music video)
- Label: EMI
- Songwriters: Robbie Williams; Brandon Christy; Craig Russo
- Producer: Trevor Horn

Robbie Williams singles chronology
"Close My Eyes" (2009)	"Bodies" (2009)	"You Know Me" (2009)

Music video
- "Bodies" on YouTube

"Bodies" is a song by English recording artist Robbie Williams. It was released on 12 October 2009 by EMI as the lead single from his eighth studio album, Reality Killed the Video Star (2009). It received its premiere on The Chris Moyles Show on BBC Radio 1 after an interview with Williams on 4 September 2009 at 8 am. It is Williams' first single release as a solo artist since "She's Madonna" in March 2007.

Producer Trevor Horn told Simon Mayo (who filled in for Chris Evans for an episode of his BBC radio show in October 2009) that the song’s trademark swooping bass riff was inspired by the song “Stay Where You Are”, which appeared on the album Faded Seaside Glamour by British indie band Delays.

"Bodies" entered and peaked at number two on the UK Singles Chart, selling 89,000 copies in its first week and attaining his best first-week sales since "Rock DJ" in August 2000. Williams was beaten to number 1 by Alexandra Burke, whose single "Bad Boys" (featuring rapper Flo Rida) was released on the same day and sold 187,000 in the same week. The cover art was photographed by Julian Broad.

== Track listing ==
International CD single

1. "Bodies" – 4:04
2. "Bodies" (Body Double Remix) – 6:14

Digital EP

1. "Bodies" – 4:04
2. "Bodies" (Body Double Remix) – 6:14
3. "Bodies" (Fred Falke Remix) – 6:53
4. "Bodies" (Cahill Refix Edit) – 3:50

== Lyrics ==
The song's cryptic lyrics, with a wide variety of religious references included, have been subject to a lot of speculation. In an October 2010 interview with Q magazine, Williams referred to the lyrics as "fucking gibberish" that he considered pointless. He also stated that "Who knows what I was going on about? I was fucking stoned."

== Music video ==
The music video for "Bodies" was filmed in the Mojave Desert, directed by Williams' frequent collaborator Vaughan Arnell and features Williams' then girlfriend, and eventual wife (married 2010), Ayda Field. It had its official premiere on 9 September 2009.

== Critical reception ==
Popjustice called the song "a confident, dignified comeback single with a big chorus" commenting that the song is "better than: 'Let Me Entertain You', as good as: 'Rock DJ', not as good as: 'Feel'." and adding that: "'Bodies' is not a comeback single that takes many chances – it is, career wise, Robbie's most important single since 'Angels' and there's obviously a certain amount of brand rebuilding needed. But nor is it a comeback single that attempts to pretend the last three years haven't happened. [...] 'Bodies' sounds like Robbie and Trevor Horn bringing out the best in each other – in this case 'the best' equalling a big comeback single from Britain's best male popstar."

Digital Spy gave the single four stars (out of five) and said that: "With an Ian Brown-esque funky strut, some monkish chanting and plenty of electro squelches, he hasn't completely ditched the not-so-successful experimentation of his last LP, but this time around he counterbalances it with a whopping great chorus that will have even Gary Barlow green with envy. [...] Packed full of his usual raised eyebrow cheekiness and with a barmy-but-bloody-massive bridge, we're still not entirely sure what the Robster's actually singing about. However, by the time he's launched into the choir-backed crescendo, on which he hollers like a hyperactive preacher, we're too sold to care. Welcome back Robbie – and don't leave it so long next time."

At a Southend gig in September 2012, Robbie commented that "Bodies" and "Rudebox" were both "lame songs" and that he had "let himself down". However, after fans spoke up against his claims via YouTube comments, he added the song to the setlist for his stadium tour for the following album.

== Charts ==
=== Weekly charts ===
Chart (2009)	Peak position
Australia (ARIA)	4
Austria (Ö3 Austria Top 40)	1
Belgium (Ultratop 50 Flanders)	5
Belgium (Ultratop 50 Wallonia)	2
CIS Airplay (TopHit)	66
Czech Republic Airplay (ČNS IFPI)	2
Denmark (Tracklisten)	2
Denmark Airplay (Tracklisten)	1
Europe (Eurochart Hot 100)	1
Europe (European Hit Radio)	3
Finland (Suomen virallinen Radiolista)	2
Finland Airplay (Radiosoittolista)	2
France (SNEP)	8
Germany (GfK)	1
Hungary (Rádiós Top 40)	1
Ireland (IRMA)	3
Italy (FIMI)	1
Italy (Musica e dischi)	2
Japan Hot 100 (Billboard)	39
Latvia (Latvijas Top 40)	5
Luxembourg Digital Songs (Billboard)	1
Netherlands (Dutch Top 40)	1
Netherlands (Single Top 100)	3
New Zealand (Recorded Music NZ)	30
Norway (VG-lista)	19
Slovakia Airplay (ČNS IFPI)	1
Spain (Promusicae)	16
Sweden (Sverigetopplistan)	4
Switzerland (Schweizer Hitparade)	1
UK Singles (Official Charts)	2
UK Airplay (Music Week)	3
US Dance Club Songs (Billboard)	6

=== Year-end charts ===
Chart (2009)	Position
Austria (Ö3 Austria Top 40)	16
Belgium (Ultratop 50 Wallonia)	68
Europe (Eurochart Hot 100)	36
France (SNEP)	90
Germany (Official German Charts)	16
Hungary (Rádiós Top 40)	40
Italy (FIMI)	21
Latvia (Latvijas Top 50)	89
Netherlands (Dutch Top 40)	29
Netherlands (Single Top 100)	74
Switzerland (Schweizer Hitparade)	16
UK Singles (OCC)	80

Chart (2010)	Position
Europe (European Hot 100 Singles)	47
Hungary (Rádiós Top 40)	15

== Certifications and sales ==
Region	Certification	Certified units/sales
Australia (ARIA)	Gold	35,000^{^}
Germany (BVMI)	Platinum	600,000^{‡}
Italy (FIMI)	Platinum	20,000^{*}
Switzerland (IFPI Switzerland)	Platinum	30,000^{^}
United Kingdom (BPI)	Silver	250,000
^{*} Sales figures based on certification alone.^{^} Shipments figures based on certification alone.^{‡} Sales+streaming figures based on certification alone.

== Release history ==
Region	Release date	Format	Label(s)
United Kingdom	4 September 2009	Airplay	Virgin Records; EMI
Australia	9 October 2009	CD single	Chrysalis Records; EMI
Germany	9 October 2009	CD single	Chrysalis Records; EMI
Austria	9 October 2009	CD single	Chrysalis Records; EMI
Switzerland	9 October 2009	CD single	Chrysalis Records; EMI
United Kingdom	11 October 2009	Digital download	Virgin Records; EMI
France	12 October 2009	CD single	Virgin Records; EMI
United Kingdom	12 October 2009	CD single	Virgin Records; EMI
Mexico	13 October 2009	Digital download	EMI
