= Fight for This Love =

2009 single by Cheryl Cole

Single by Cheryl Cole

from the album 3 Words
- B-side: "Didn't I"
- Released: 30 October 2009
- Recorded: 2009
- Studio: SubZero Studios (Santa Monica)
- Genre: Pop; dance-pop; R&B
- Length: 3:46
- Label: Fascination; Polydor
- Songwriters: Steve Kipner; Wayne Wilkins; Andre Merritt
- Producers: Wayne Wilkins; Steve Kipner

Cheryl Cole singles chronology
"Heartbreaker" (2008)	"Fight for This Love" (2009)	"3 Words" (2009)

Music video
- "Fight for This Love" on YouTube

"Fight for This Love" is the debut solo single by English singer Cheryl Cole, recorded for her debut studio album, 3 Words (2009). It was released in the United Kingdom and Ireland as the lead single in 2009 by Fascination Records (Polydor Records) and in 2010 in some European countries as the album's second single through Universal Music. It was written and produced by Wayne Wilkins and Steve Kipner with an additional writing from Andre Merrit. The up-tempo pop, dance-pop and R&B song revolves around a lyrical content of not giving up on the partner.

"Fight for This Love" divided music critics; some praised Cheryl's vocals and the powerful production, noting that it had the potential to be a hit with the clubs while other critics criticised the sluggish verses and weak vocals. The accompanying music video was directed by Ray Kay. It was generally well received by media and critics who drew comparisons to the works of Janet Jackson and the video for "Put the Needle On It" (2002) by Dannii Minogue.

Following her first performance of the song on The X Factor it topped charts in Ireland and the United Kingdom. In May 2010 it was certified platinum by the British Phonographic Industry for shipments topping 600,000 units. In December 2012 "Fight for This Love" became the 125th single to reach the million mark in UK Chart history, and the third to reach the feat in 2012, along with Carly Rae Jepsen's "Call Me Maybe" and Gotye's "Somebody That I Used to Know". "Fight for This Love" also achieved success in Europe by topping charts in Norway, Hungary and Denmark. "Fight for This Love" received a BRIT Award nomination in the Best British Single category.

== Background and composition ==
"Fight for This Love" is Cole's first solo single outside of girl band Girls Aloud following 20 top-ten singles with the group.

Cheryl – "Fight for This Love" (2009)
22 second clip of the song where Cheryl sings the chorus showing the repetition of the word "Fight".

The song is an uptempo pop, dance-pop and R&B song with a synthy production, written in the key of G major with a time signature in common time and a tempo of 123 beats per minute. The vocal range spans from E_{3} to D_{5}. The basic chord progression of the song is Am, G, D, G, Bm, and Em. In the middle eight it features a breakdown where the song's usual instruments are replaced with hand claps whilst some of the media reported that Cole's voice had a Whitney Houston-like tone to it. NME magazine reported that some people noticed similarities between the song and the 2007 song "Lil Star" by American singer Kelis, though Cole's representatives denied any similarities. A reviewer also noted the similarity of the melody to KC and JoJo's All My Life. "Fight for This Love" was later covered by British boyband The Wanted, who released it as the B-side to their number-one single, "All Time Low".

== Critical reception ==
Critical reception towards "Fight for This Love" has been mixed. Ruth Harrison from 'Female First' was impressed by the song after initially being worried that Cole would not be able to cope going solo. She said "Whilst it does sound just a little bit Girls Aloud-y, we still love it, and can see it being a huge hit on the club circuit up and down the country ... we think this is going to send her well on her way to global superstardom." Popjustice also liked the song saying "'Fight for This Love' is very definitely not just a Girls Aloud single with one person singing it... its one of those songs you can have on repeat for an hour and a half without getting bored. One thing that hits you is – well, is this really what Cheryl sounds like? Vocally it's a big surprise... As it turns out, she sounds really great – strong, confident, direct. Like a proper pop singer. It's a sleek, powerful production..." Matthew Chisling of Allmusic picked the song as one of the best from the album, praising it for being "a terrific midtempo number with a heck of a chorus."

Meanwhile, David Balls of Digital Spy was only moderately impressed and argued that "Cole's vocals aren't terribly strong" but that she had "understated charm and lots of 'X Factor' exposure". Of the song itself he said "Cole has taken the subtle approach on her first solo single. 'Fight for This Love' is a midtempo pop-R&B track with subdued, synthy production and an infectious hook that gnaws into the consciousness – albeit after a few listens." Whilst Fraser McAlpine partially agreed "In Cheryl's favour, she's obviously made an effort to record something that sounds different from the stuff she'd be making with Girls Aloud, and as a result this solo effort is an interesting pop/dance/R&B hybrid, which actually suits her rather well, style-wise." However he too had issues with the voice "It's just a shame it's not stronger," pointing out some weaknesses, "the best thing about the song is the bridge, which is sassy but vulnerable at the same time, and underpinned by a sweet melody, but the rest of the song can't match up: the verses are sluggish...".

== Chart performance ==
In the United Kingdom, "Fight for This Love" debuted at number one on the UK Singles Chart. The placement marked Cole's first number one song in the United Kingdom as a solo artist, following five chart-toppers with Girls Aloud's "Sound of the Underground" (2002), "I'll Stand by You" (2004), "Walk This Way" (2007), and "The Promise" (2008). It sold 134,000 copies in one day beating the previous record held by Cole's X Factor protégé Alexandra Burke with the song "Bad Boys" which sold 187,100 over a seven-day span. The final first week sales totalled 292,000 copies beating the 213,000 that Girls Aloud's debut single, "Sound of the Underground" sold back in 2002. The single remained at number one for two weeks and consequently went on to become the best selling single of the year up to that point. By the end of 2009 it was declared the fourth best-selling single of the year, and 29th best selling of the decade (2000s). On 14 May 2010, just over six months after release, the single was certified platinum by the British Phonographic Industry (BPI) and earned Cole a nomination for Best British Single at the 2010 BRIT Awards, which she had previously won at the 2009 BRIT Awards with Girls Aloud for their single, "The Promise". However, she lost out to "Beat Again" by former X Factor runners-up JLS in what was deemed a "controversial win," as the announcer claimed Cole was the front-runner.

"Fight for This Love" entered the Irish Singles Chart at number thirteen and the following week on the chart dated 22 October 2009 the song rose to number one, giving Cole her first chart topper in Ireland since "Sound of the Underground" with Girls Aloud. In Denmark the song peaked at number one on 12 March 2010 as well as topping the charts in Hungary and Norway. The International Federation of the Phonographic Industry (IFPI) certified the single platinum in Denmark and gold in Switzerland. As of December 2012, "Fight for This Love" has sold over 1 million copies in the United Kingdom, making it the best selling single of Cheryl's career both solo and with Girls Aloud.

== Music video ==
A scene from "Fight for This Love" where Cole appears against a textbook backdrop with doodles.

The music video was directed by Ray Kay and was filmed in early September 2009. Kay commented on the filming of the clip saying "The recordings went very well, and Cheryl was fantastic to work with. I drove her very hard at the shoot, and it was very difficult on her part. My job was relaxing in comparison. We made the video in London, with a lot of focus on fashion and dance, with very tough choreography, before putting it all together in Los Angeles afterwards. I have a strong feeling that this will be a #1 for Cheryl in England!"

=== Synopsis ===
The video starts off with Cole in a simple white vest, and biker gloves, accompanied with an entourage of female dancers dressed in black. Various scenes throughout the video include Cole in silk leopard print bottoms, an all black outfit with silver sparks coming out from both sides of her top, standing in what would appear to be her maths workbook, in which she has been doodling and writing poems rather than doing her maths while wearing what appears to be a corset with two miniature beds of nails strapped to the side and [later] a soldier themed outfit with the famous red Balmain jacket in which she salutes a full eight times during the video.

=== Reception ===
Jennifer Adeeko of the MOBOs praised the video saying "the songstress [is] looking sensational ... make-up done to perfection ... giving her that edge. Her performance comes across as effortless. ... The HD quality video comes across as pure artwork." Grazia considered Cole's military outfit "second rate Janet Jackson."

Anna Pickard of The Guardian took a different opinion choosing to focus on how Cole appeared to be "making up for the lack of having Girls Aloud around her by pretending to be all of them at once" and anguish of her own marriage issues. She noted that Cole's various outfits appear to distract people from the lyrics of the song which "seem to be, a thinly veiled reflection on her own marriage compounded by the sad mooning face she keeps pulling. [It is not surprising when one is] singing a solo song about one's troubled (though reconciled and apparently happy) marriage. Although sometimes she looks cross instead. And quite a lot of the time, she looks like she's her own evil sexy twin."

== Promotion ==
=== UK and Ireland ===
The single premiered on Chris Moyles's breakfast show on 7 September on BBC Radio 1. On Sunday 18 October 2009 the song was released for digital download in the UK. Cole took to the stage of The X Factor Live Results Show later that evening to perform the song for the first time. She adorned a military-themed outfit by Welsh fashion designer Julien MacDonald. It consisted of a sheer bodysuit, a red military jacket with black epaulettes as well as other details, black harem trousers and Alexander Wang boots. The outfit itself was subject to media attention, with some reporting that online debates had drawn comparisons to the outfit worn by 1992 video game antagonist M. Bison from the Street Fighter series. Media also considered Cole's outfit and performance inspired by Janet Jackson. Cole denied miming, though she admitted to having some pre-recorded vocals to help the live performance. The show, which also featured the first UK performance by Whitney Houston in six years, drew a record audience of 14.8 million, making it the most watched episode in the show's history at that time.

She also taped a performance for UK teen channel T4, which aired 15 November 2009. Rufus Hound would later go on to perform a parody of Cole's X Factor Stint on BBC's Let's Dance for Sport Relief. Cole appeared at 'Children in Need Rocks the Royal Albert Hall' on 12 November 2009] to perform "Fight for This Love" in a white version of her 'X Factor' performance outfit and later returning to perform Snow Patrol's single "Set the Fire to the Third Bar" with Gary Lightbody. The performances were later televised as a part of the Children in Need 2009 telethon on 20 November. UK paper, The Daily Telegraph wrote that Cole "nailed the harmony vocal with a fragile empathy that should silence those who dare to suggest she can't sing." In December ITV1 aired a one-off television special titled Cheryl Cole's Night In, presented by Holly Willoughby. She performed "Fight for This Love" with her hair in a tight bun and a ninja-inspired outfit, another variation on the military theme which had become synonymous with the song. The song also incorporated a dance break where Cole included a dance routine with samurai swords.

Then on 16 February Cole appeared at the 2010 BRIT Awards for a performance which began with Cole being "catapulted" on stage with her dancers. Cole and her dancers initially wore gold-trimmed white trench coats before revealing a hooded black bodysuit. The performance included a bridge sampled from song "Be" which features vocals from former X Factor contestant Rowetta Satchell. Satchell initially refused to allow Cole to use the sample and was disappointed that they had not asked her to sing it despite Polydor Records stating they would not use the sample, reports later surfaced surrounding an alleged legal battle. Cole also received media attention for performing without her wedding ring, following reports that husband Ashley had cheated, as well as for allegedly miming the song.

=== Europe ===
In January 2010 Cole flew to Germany to perform "Fight for This Love" at German Award Ceremony, DLD Starnight at the Haus der Kunst in Munich. In March European promotion for the single and album resumed with an appearance and performance on Danish X Factor which consequently led to the song topping the Danish Singles Chart. Other performances in Europe included Vivement Dimanche in France; Norway's Skavlan, and Dutch The X Factor. In Germany the song was used as the title theme to the fifth series of Germany's Next Topmodel.

== Track listing ==
- Ireland / UK CD single
1. "Fight for This Love" (Andre Merrit, Steve Kipner, Wayne Wilkins) – 3:46
2. "Didn't I" (Andrea Remanda, Cheryl Cole, Klaus Derendorf) – 3:45
- Ireland / UK Digital single
1. "Fight for This Love" – 3:46
2. "Fight for This Love" (Moto Blanco Club Mix) – 7:28
- Ireland / UK — Digital Remix (EP)
1. "Fight for This Love" – 3:46
2. "Fight for This Love" (Cahill Club Mix) – 6:27
3. "Fight for This Love" (Crazy Cousinz Club Mix) – 5:42
4. "Fight for This Love" (Sunship Old Skool UK Garage Remix) – 5:01
5. "Fight for This Love" (Moto Blanco Radio Edit) – 3:42
6. "Fight for This Love" (Crazy Cousinz Radio Edit) – 4:00
- International Digital single (1)
1. "Fight for This Love" – 3:46
2. "Fight for This Love" (Cahill Radio Edit) – 3:44
- International Digital single (2)
1. "Fight for This Love" – 3:46
2. "Fight for This Love" (Crazy Cousinz Radio Edit) – 3:58
- International — Digital Remix EP
1. "Fight for This Love" – 3:46
2. "Fight for This Love" (Cahill Club Mix) – 6:26
3. "Fight for This Love" (Crazy Cousinz Club Mix) – 5:42
4. "Fight for This Love" (Crazy Cousinz Dub) – 5:26
5. "Fight for This Love" (Moto Blanco Radio Edit) – 3:42

== Credits and personnel ==
"Fight for This Love" was recorded at 'SubZero Studios' in Santa Monica, California whilst "Didn't I" was recorded at Klausound Studio, Studio City; The Red Room, Hollywood and Artquake Studios Burbank all in California.

"Fight for This Love"

- Lead vocals — Cheryl Cole
- Background vocals — RaVaughn Brown
- Engineer — Mark Vinten
- Mixing — Mark "Spike" Stent
- Mixing assistant — Matty Green
- Production, keyboards, drums — Steve Kipner, Wayne Wilkins

"Didn't I"

- Lead vocals — Cheryl Cole
- Engineer — Brian Paturalski, Klaus D, Neil Tucker
- Mastered by — Tom Coyne
- Mixing — Neil Tucker
- Production — Klaus D
- Programmed by — Klaus D

== Charts ==
=== Weekly charts ===
Chart (2009–2010)	Peak position
Australia (ARIA)	54
Australia (ARIA Dance Chart)	12
Austria (Ö3 Austria Top 40)	4
Belgium (Ultratop 50 Flanders)	13
Belgium (Ultratop 50 Wallonia)	7
Czech Republic Airplay (ČNS IFPI)	8
Denmark (Tracklisten)	1
Europe (European Hot 100 Singles)	3
France (SNEP)	7
Germany (GfK)	4
Hungary (Rádiós Top 40)	1
Hungary (Single Top 40)	4
Ireland (IRMA)	1
Italy (FIMI)	5
Luxembourg Digital Songs (Billboard)	2
Netherlands (Dutch Top 40)	2
Netherlands (Single Top 100)	5
Norway (VG-lista)	1
Poland Airplay (ZPAV)	3
Poland Dance (ZPAV)	31
Poland (Video Chart)	1
Russia Airplay (TopHit)	9
Scottish Singles Sales (Official Charts)	1
Slovakia Airplay (ČNS IFPI)	8
Spain (Promusicae)	12
Spain (Spanish Airplay Chart)	3
Sweden (Sverigetopplistan)	2
Switzerland (Schweizer Hitparade)	3
UK Singles (Official Charts)	1

=== Year-end charts ===
Chart (2009)	Position
Ireland (IRMA)	5
UK Singles (OCC)	4

Chart (2010)	Position
Austria (Ö3 Austria Top 40)	45
Belgium (Ultratop 50 Flanders)	78
Belgium (Ultratop 50 Wallonia)	62
Denmark (Tracklisten)	13
Europe (European Hot 100 Singles)	22
France (SNEP)	70
Germany (Media Control AG)	37
Hungary (Rádiós Top 40)	1
Italy (FIMI)	28
Italy Airplay (EarOne)	9
Netherlands (Single Top 100)	29
Romania (Romanian Top 100)	82
Russia Airplay (TopHit)	88
Spain (PROMUSICAE)	46
Spain (Spanish Airplay Chart)	19
Sweden (Sverigetopplistan)	75
Switzerland (Media Control AG)	38
UK Singles (OCC)	113

=== Decade-end charts ===
Chart (2000–2009)	Position
UK Singles (OCC)	29

== Certifications ==
Region	Certification	Certified units/sales
Denmark (IFPI Danmark)	Gold	15,000^{^}
Germany (BVMI)	Gold	150,000^{^}
Italy (FIMI)	Platinum	20,000^{*}
Sweden (GLF)	Platinum	20,000^{‡}
Switzerland (IFPI Switzerland)	Gold	15,000^{^}
United Kingdom (BPI)	2× Platinum	1,050,000
^{*} Sales figures based on certification alone.^{^} Shipments figures based on certification alone.^{‡} Sales+streaming figures based on certification alone.

== Airplay premiere and release history ==
Region	Date	Format	Label	Catalogue
United Kingdom	7 September 2009	Airplay — Premiere	Fascination	2733405
Ireland	30 October 2009	Digital download; EP; CD	Polydor	2733405; 2721778
Netherlands	18 October 2009	Digital download	Universal	060252721778
Sweden	18 October 2009	Digital download	Universal	060252721778
United Kingdom	18 October 2009	Digital download; EP	Fascination	2733405
United Kingdom	19 October 2009	CD single	Fascination	2721778
France	18 December 2009	Digital download	Universal	060252735320
Mexico	2 February 2010	Digital download	Universal	060252721778
Belgium	8 February 2010	Digital download	Universal	060252721778
Brazil	8 February 2010	Digital download	Universal	060252721778
Denmark	8 February 2010	Digital download	Universal	060252721778
Finland	8 February 2010	Digital download	Universal	060252721778
Greece	8 February 2010	Digital download	Universal	060252721778
Luxembourg	8 February 2010	Digital download	Universal	060252721778
Norway	8 February 2010	Digital download	Universal	060252721778
Portugal	8 February 2010	Digital download	Universal	060252735320
Spain	8 February 2010	Digital download	Universal	060252735320
Switzerland	8 February 2010	Digital download	Universal	060252721778
Germany	12 February 2010	Digital download	Universal	060252735320
Germany	26 February 2010	CD single	Universal	2721778
Italy	9 April 2010	Digital download	Universal	060252735320
Australia	7 May 2010	Digital EP	Universal	060252735320

== See also ==
- List of number-one singles of 2009 (Ireland)
- List of number-one singles of 2009 (Scotland)
- List of UK Singles Chart number ones of the 2000s
- List of number-one singles of the 2010s (Hungary)
- List of number-one singles of 2010 (Norway)
- List of Platinum singles in the United Kingdom awarded since 2000
