= In Their Lives: Great Writers on Great Beatles Songs =

2017 collection of essays

- Editor: Andrew Blauner
- Language: English
- Genre: Music
- Publisher: Blue Rider Press
- Publication date: May 23, 2017
- Publication place: United States
- Media type: Print / Digital
- Pages: 320
- ISBN: 978-0-7352-1069-1
- Dewey Decimal: 782.4216 I
- LC Class: ML421.B4 I5 2017
- Website: Penguin Random House

In Their Lives: Great Writers on Great Beatles Songs is a collection of essays in which twenty-nine authors and musicians discuss their favorite Beatles songs. The book is edited by Andrew Blauner, and features an introductory note by Paul McCartney.

== Essays ==
Author	Song
Roz Chast	"She Loves You"
Alan Light	"I Saw Her Standing There"
Jane Smiley	"I Want to Hold Your Hand"
Shawn Colvin	"I'll Be Back"
Rosanne Cash	"No Reply"
Gerald Early	"I'm a Loser"
Pico Iyer	"Yesterday"
Amy Bloom	"Norwegian Wood"
Rebecca Mead	"Eleanor Rigby"
Maria Popova	"Yellow Submarine"
Peter Blauner	"And Your Bird Can Sing"
Jon Pareles	"Tomorrow Never Knows"
Thomas Beller	"Lucy in the Sky with Diamonds"
Mona Simpson	"She's Leaving Home"
Joseph O'Neill	"Good Day Sunshine"
Alec Wilkinson	"She Said She Said"
Adam Gopnik	"Strawberry Fields Forever" / "Penny Lane"
Nicholas Dawidoff	"A Day in the Life"
Ben Zimmer	"I am the Walrus"
David Duchovny	"Dear Prudence"
Chuck Klosterman	"Helter Skelter"
Touré	"The Ballad of John and Yoko"
Elissa Schappell	"Octopus's Garden"
Rick Moody	"The End"
David Hajdu	"You Know My Name (Look Up the Number)"
Francine Prose and Emilia Ruiz-Michels	"Here Comes the Sun" / "There's a Place"
John Hockenberry	"Let It Be"
Bill Flanagan	"Two of Us"
