= Madstock =

Madstock may refer to:

- Madstock..., a 1990 album by Candy Flip
- Madstock!, a 1992 live album by Madness
