= Candy Flip =

British band

- Origin: Stoke-on-Trent, England
- Genres: Electronic, dance, Madchester
- Years active: 1989–1992
- Labels: Debut, Atlantic
- Past members: Danny Spencer; Ric Peet

Candy Flip were an English electronic music duo made up of Danny Spencer (vocals, keyboards) and Ric Peet (keyboards) from Stoke-on-Trent, who were associated with the indie dance music scene in the early 1990s (a scene more commonly known as Madchester or baggy). They are best remembered for their cover version of the Beatles song "Strawberry Fields Forever", which was a No. 3 hit on the UK Singles Chart in 1990.

== Origins of name and formation ==
Candy Flip were named after "candyflipping", the slang term for the practice of taking ecstasy and LSD at the same time. The band was formed in 1990 by Danny Spencer (vocals, keyboards) and Ric Peet (keyboards), and was originally called Yin Yang.

== "Strawberry Fields Forever" and chart success ==
The duo had a Top 10 UK hit single with an electronic cover of the Beatles' "Strawberry Fields Forever" in 1990. The track sampled the drum beat from James Brown's "Funky Drummer", overdubbing a hi hat and heavy reverb. Candy Flip's track was initially a club hit within the rave scene before crossing over into the pop chart. The track was reissued on vinyl in 2005 on S12 Records. Disco Mix Club remixed the Candy Flip version, removing the beat and adding an interpolation of "Hey Jude" to the outro.

The B-side of the first 12-inch single contained another electronic track entitled "Can You Feel the Love". A second 12-inch single release featured the 'Raspberry Ripple Remix' of the lead track backed by "Rhythim of Love" (sic).

In 1991, Candy Flip released their first album, Madstock.... A further two singles were released, the first being "Space" which made UK No. 98, and "This Can Be Real", which reached UK No. 60. Candy Flip split up in 1992.

== Recent activity ==
Peet became a record producer and engineer, working with bands such as the Charlatans and Six by Seven.

In the early 1990s, Spencer, together with his brother Kelvin Andrews, became the remix duo Sure Is Pure who provided remixes for other artists such as UK band Space and Eurythmics' Dave Stewart. The duo's remixes of the Sister Sledge back catalogue, scored the 1970s disco group a couple of UK top 20 chart hits in 1993, including a number 5 position for an updated version of "We Are Family". Sure Is Pure also had a label called Pharm, which scored a UK number 8 hit in 1997 with Blue Boy's "Remember Me" after it was licensed to Jive Records.

In the late 1990s, Spencer and Andrews went on to form Sound 5, releasing the album No Illicit Dancing in 2000 on Gut Records, before the duo became Soul Mekanik. In 2006, the duo (as Soul Mekanik) produced four songs on the Robbie Williams album Rudebox and, under the name Central Midfield, co-wrote ten of the tracks on Williams' 2009 album Reality Killed the Video Star.

== Discography ==
=== Albums ===
- Madstock... (1990)

=== Singles ===
Year	Title	Chart Position							Album
Year	Title	UK	IRE	BEL (FLA)	AUS	NZ	US Modern Rock	US Dance	Album
1989	"Love Is Life"	144	—	—	—	—	—	—	Madstock...
1990	"Strawberry Fields Forever"	3	7	47	29	20	11	9	Madstock...
1990	"This Can Be Real"	60	—	—	—	—	—	—	Madstock...
1990	"Space"	98	—	—	—	—	—	—	Madstock...
1991	"Redhills Road"	86	—	—	—	—	19	10	Madstock...
