= David Mason (trumpeter) =

English trumpeter (1926–2011)

- Born: 2 April 1926; London, England
- Died: 29 April 2011 (aged 85); London, England
- Occupation: Trumpeter

David Mason (2 April 1926 – 29 April 2011) was an English orchestral, solo and session trumpet player. He played the flugelhorn for the premiere of Ralph Vaughan Williams's ninth symphony and the piccolo trumpet solo on the Beatles' song "Penny Lane".

== Career ==
Mason was born in London, and educated at Christ's Hospital and the Royal College of Music where he studied with Ernest Hall. His early playing career benefited from the timing of the Second World War: as a sixteen-year-old he was ineligible for call-up where many older players had already been recruited, and was thus able to pick up a lot of work in London before and during his time as a student at the Royal College of Music, which was itself interrupted by his own call-up into the Band of the Scots Guards. Before call-up he was the youngest member of the then National Symphony Orchestra.

After leaving the Royal College of Music, Mason became a member of the orchestra of the Royal Opera House, moving on later to the Royal Philharmonic Orchestra where he eventually became principal trumpet. After seven years in that role he moved to the Philharmonia, where he remained for most of the rest of his orchestral career. He was a professor of trumpet at the Royal College of Music for thirty years and thus taught many of the trumpet players who now make up the core of the profession in the UK.

The Royal College of Music has awarded a David Mason Prize for Orchestral Trumpet Playing.

Mason was the flugelhorn soloist for the world premiere of Ralph Vaughan Williams's Symphony No. 9 on 2 April 1958. The novelty of the flugelhorn (often seen as a jazz or brass band instrument) being used in such a significant mainstream classical work attracted much press comment at the time, perhaps to the detriment of the symphony's overall coverage and consideration.

== Penny Lane ==
On 17 January 1967 at Abbey Road Studios Mason recorded the piccolo trumpet solo which is a prominent part of the Beatles' song "Penny Lane". The solo, inspired by Mason's performance of Bach's 2nd Brandenburg Concerto with the English Chamber Orchestra, is in a mock-Baroque style for which the piccolo trumpet is particularly suited, having a clean and clear sound which penetrates well through thicker midrange textures.

Mason recorded the solo using a piccolo trumpet in A (this uses a slightly longer leadpipe than the piccolo trumpet in B-flat, which itself is an octave higher than a standard B-flat trumpet). Although such piccolo trumpet solos became almost commonplace in some types of pop, this was innovative at the time and was among the first such uses: George Martin later wrote, "The result was unique, something which had never been done in rock music before".

Mason also contributed to several other Beatles songs, including "A Day in the Life", "Magical Mystery Tour", "All You Need Is Love" and "It's All Too Much".

== Death ==
Mason died of leukaemia in April 2011, at the age of 85.
