= Rebecca Mead =

English writer

Rebecca Mead (born 24 September 1966) is an English writer and journalist.

== Early life and education ==
Rebecca Mead was born in London, England. When she was three years old she relocated with her family to the seaside town of Weymouth in Dorset, where she grew up. Mead's father was a civil servant. As a teenager she became interested in left-wing politics.

Mead studied English literature at the University of Oxford.

After graduating from Oxford she won a full scholarship to study for a master's degree in journalism at New York University.

== Career ==
While at NYU, Mead was employed as an intern by New York Magazine. After graduation the magazine employed her as a fact checker. After a few years she was promoted to features writer. She joined The New Yorker as a staff writer in 1997.

Mead published My Life In Middlemarch (The Road to Middlemarch in the UK) in 2014. A personal study of George Eliot's best-known novel, it received mixed reviews.

== Personal life ==
Mead was naturalised as an American citizen in 2011 and moved back to the United Kingdom in 2018.

== Bibliography ==
=== Books ===
- Mead, Rebecca (2007). One perfect day : the selling of the American wedding. New York: Penguin Press.
- — (2014). The road to Middlemarch : my life with George Eliot. Granta Publications.
- — (2022). Home/land : a memoir of departure and return.

Chapters

- Mead, Rebecca (2017). "Eleanor Rigby". In Blauner, Andrew (ed.). In their lives : great writers on great Beatles songs. Blue Rider Press.

=== Essays, reporting and other contributions ===
- Mead, Rebecca (September 15, 1997). "Fax from the vineyard". The Talk of the Town. The New Yorker. 73 (27): 31.
- — (September 29, 1997). "The nostalgic gourmet". The Talk of the Town. The New Yorker.
- — (October 6, 1997). "The pictures". The Talk of the Town. The New Yorker.
- — (October 13, 1997). "The good old days". The Talk of the Town. The New Yorker.
- — (November 10, 1997). "Rag trade". The Talk of the Town. The New Yorker.
- — (November 17, 1997). "Ink". The Talk of the Town. The New Yorker. 73 (35): 37–38.
- — (December 22, 1997). "Pecking order". The Talk of the Town. The New Yorker. 73 (40): 49–50.
- — (May 24, 2010). "Fill in the blank". The Talk of the Town. Feathers Dept. The New Yorker. 86 (14): 20, 22.
- — (May 24, 2010). "Rage machine : Andrew Breitbart's empire of bluster". The Wayward Press. The New Yorker. 86 (14): 26–32.
- — (September 1, 2014). "The troll slayer : a Cambridge classicist takes on her sexist detractors". Profiles. The New Yorker. 90 (25): 30–36.
- — (February 9, 2015). "All about the Hamiltons". Onward and Upward with the Arts. The New Yorker. 90 (47): 48–57. (Note: Online version is titled "A hip-hop interpretation of the Founding Fathers".)
- — (March 23, 2015). "Sole cycle : the homely Birkenstock gets a fashion makeover". On and Off the Avenue. The New Yorker. 91 (5): 42–48. (Note: Online version is titled "Happy ugly feet".)
- — (December 7, 2015). "The scream". The Talk of the Town. The Musical Life. The New Yorker. 91 (39): 26. (Note: Title in the online table of contents is "Marlis Petersen ends on a high note".)
- — (April 25, 2016). "Counterparts". The Talk of the Town. The Bench. The New Yorker. 92 (11): 35. (Note: Title in the online table of contents is "'Custody,' a film of Family Court".)
- — (March 20, 2017). "Rise up : Alex Timbers directs 'Joan of Arc,' a musical call to arms for the Trump era". Onward and Upward with the Arts. The New Yorker. 93 (5): 44–51. (Note: Online version is titled "A protest musical for the Trump era".)
- — (April 24, 2017). "Chewing it over". The Talk of the Town. Dept. of Big Questions. The New Yorker. 93 (10): 37–38. (Note: Online version is titled "When kids philosophize".)
- — (May 8, 2017). "Under a bushel". The Talk of the Town. The Creative Life. The New Yorker. 93 (12): 18–19. (Note: Online version is titled "Terence Davies’s poetic melancholy".)
- — (May 20, 2019). "Self-portrait of a lady". Onward and Upward with the Arts. The New Yorker. 95 (13): 28–34. (Note: Online version is titled "Joanna Hogg's self-portrait of a lady".)
- — (September 27, 2021). "Height of glamour : how the designer Harris Reed helps Harry Styles and Solange play with masculinity and femininity". The New Yorker. 97 (30): 44–57. (Note: Title in the online table of contents is "Harris Reed’s gender-fluid fashion".)
- — (April 25 – May 2, 2022). "Norwegian wood : in Scandinavia, ecologically minded architects are building skyscrapers with pillars of pine and spruce". Onward and Upward with the Arts. The New Yorker. 98 (10): 48–55. (Note: Online version is titled "Transforming trees into skyscrapers".)
- — (August 22, 2022). "Goop : Anish Kapoor has made a fortune sculpting with unusual materials". Profiles. The New Yorker. 98 (25): 42–53. (Note: Online version is titled "Anish Kapoor's material values".)
- — (February 13–20, 2023). "The merry widow : the ninety-year-old aristocrat known for her cheeky accounts of the British élite". Onward and Upward with the Arts. The New Yorker. 99 (1): 18–24. (Note: Online version is titled "Oldest living aristocratic widow tells all".)
- — (July 3, 2023). "Portrait keeper". The Talk of the Town. London Postcard. The New Yorker. 99 (19): 14–15. (Note: Title in the online table of contents is "Ridding the National Portrait Gallery of its gentlemen's-club vibe".)
- — (March 10, 2025). "If you can't stand the heat : why menopause never gets old". Reflections. The New Yorker. 101 (3): 28–31. (Note: Online version is titled "Menopause is having a moment".)

———————

Bibliography notes
