= Strawberry Fields Forever =

1967 single by the Beatles

- US picture sleeve

Single by the Beatles
- A-side: "Penny Lane" (double A-side)
- Released: 13 February 1967
- Recorded: 24–29 November, 8–21 December 1966
- Studio: EMI, London
- Genre: Psychedelic rock; art pop; progressive pop; psychedelic pop; acid rock; experimental rock
- Length: 4:07
- Label: Parlophone (UK); Capitol (US)
- Songwriter: Lennon–McCartney
- Producer: George Martin

The Beatles singles chronology
| "Yellow Submarine" / "Eleanor Rigby" (1966) | "Strawberry Fields Forever" / "Penny Lane" (1967) | "All You Need Is Love" (1967) |

Promotional film
- "Strawberry Fields Forever" on YouTube

"Strawberry Fields Forever" is a song by the English rock band the Beatles, written by John Lennon and credited to Lennon–McCartney. It was released on 13 February 1967 as a double A-side single with "Penny Lane". It represented a departure from the group's previous singles and a novel listening experience for the contemporary pop audience. While the song initially divided and confused music critics and the group's fans, it proved highly influential on the emerging psychedelic genre. Its accompanying promotional film is similarly recognised as a pioneering work in the medium of music video.

Lennon based the song on his childhood memories of playing in the garden of Strawberry Field, a Salvation Army children's home in Liverpool. Starting in November 1966, the band spent 45 hours in the studio, spread over five weeks, creating three versions of the track. The final recording combined two of those versions, which were entirely different in tempo, mood and musical key. It features reverse-recorded instrumentation, Mellotron flute sounds, an Indian swarmandal, and a fade-out/fade-in coda, as well as a cello and brass arrangement by producer George Martin. For the promotional film, the band used experimental techniques such as reverse effects, jump-cuts and superimposition.

The song was the first track the Beatles recorded after completing Revolver and was intended for inclusion on their forthcoming (as yet untitled) Sgt. Pepper's Lonely Hearts Club Band. Instead, under pressure from their record company and management for new product, the group were forced to issue it as a single and they followed their usual practice of not including previously released singles on their albums. The double A-side peaked at number 2 on the Record Retailer chart, breaking the band's four-year run of chart-topping singles in the UK. In the United States, "Strawberry Fields Forever" peaked at number 8 on the Billboard Hot 100. The song was later included on the US Magical Mystery Tour LP.

Lennon viewed "Strawberry Fields Forever" as his finest work with the Beatles. After Lennon's murder in New York City, a section of Central Park was named after the song. In 1996, the discarded first version of the song was issued on the outtakes compilation Anthology 2; in 2006, a new version was created for the remix album Love. Artists who have covered the song include Richie Havens, Todd Rundgren, Peter Gabriel, Ben Harper, and Los Fabulosos Cadillacs featuring Debbie Harry. In 1990, a version by the Madchester group Candy Flip became a top-ten hit in the UK and Ireland. The song was ranked number 7 on Rolling Stone's updated 2021 list of "The 500 Greatest Songs of All Time".

== Background and writing ==
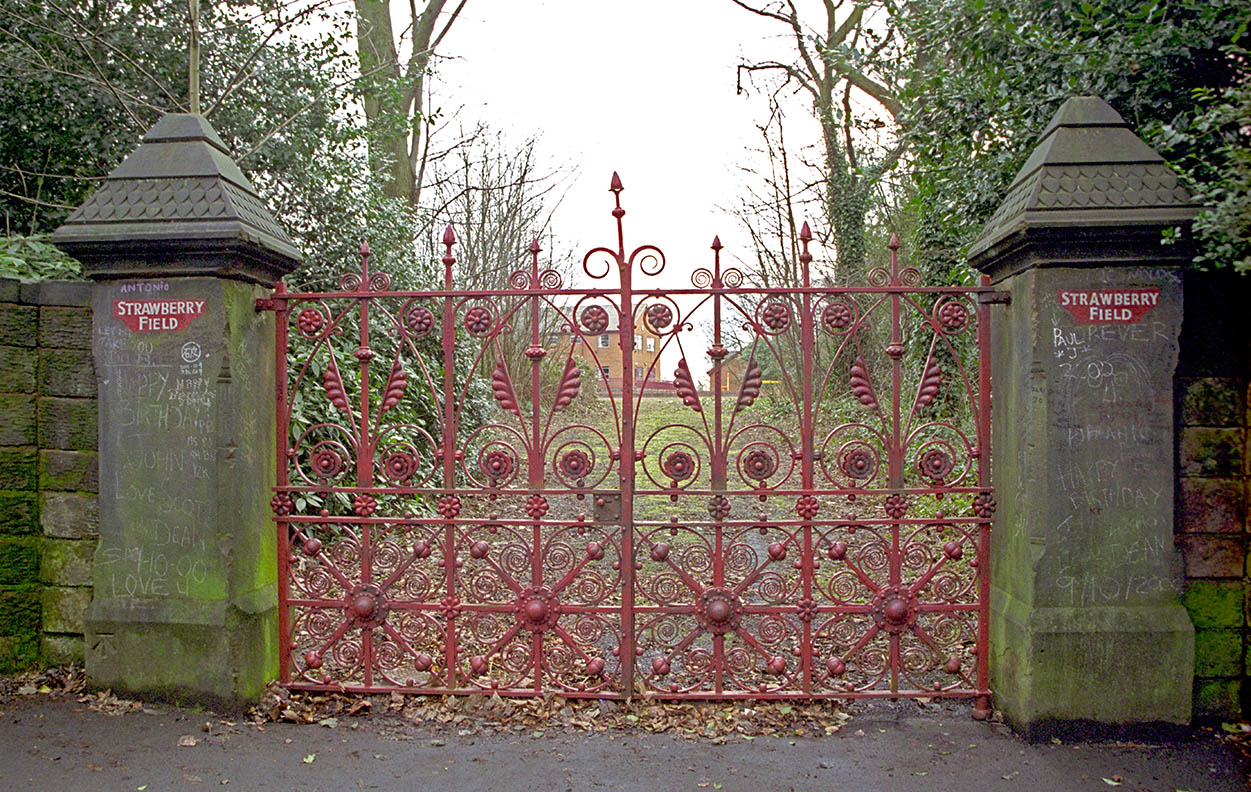
Entrance gates at Strawberry Field, near Lennon's childhood home in Woolton, Liverpool, pictured 2007

Strawberry Field was the name of a Salvation Army children's home close to John Lennon's childhood home in Woolton, a suburb of Liverpool. Lennon and his friends Pete Shotton, Nigel Walley and Ivan Vaughan used to play in the wooded garden behind the home. One of Lennon's childhood treats was the garden party held each summer in Calderstones Park, near the home, where a Salvation Army brass band played. Lennon's aunt Mimi Smith recalled: "There was something about the place that always fascinated John. He could see it from his window [...] He used to hear the Salvation Army band [playing at the garden party], and he would pull me along, saying, 'Hurry up, Mimi – we're going to be late.'"

Lennon began writing "Strawberry Fields Forever" in Almería, Spain, during the filming of Richard Lester's How I Won the War in September–October 1966. The Beatles had just retired from touring after one of their most difficult periods, which included the "more popular than Jesus" controversy and being the target of mob violence in reaction to their unintentional snubbing of Philippines First Lady Imelda Marcos. Working on Lester's film without his bandmates left Lennon feeling vulnerable; according to his wife Cynthia, he was also distraught to learn in late October that Alma Cogan, the English singer whom "he'd earmarked to replace Aunt Mimi in his affections", had died in London at the age of 34. In the first versions that Lennon committed to tape, in September, there was no reference to Strawberry Field. Author Steve Turner says that at this stage, Lennon most likely drew inspiration from Nikos Kazantzakis's autobiographical novel Report to Greco, which he was reading in Almería and "tells of a writer searching for spiritual meaning".

I was different all my life. The second verse goes, "No one I think is in my tree." Well, I was too shy and self-doubting. Nobody seems to be as hip as me is what I was saying. Therefore, I must be crazy or a genius – "I mean it must be high or low" ...

— John Lennon, 1980

Like "Penny Lane", which Paul McCartney wrote in late 1966 in response to Lennon's new song, "Strawberry Fields Forever" conveys nostalgia for the Beatles' early years in Liverpool. While both songs refer to actual locations, McCartney said that the two pieces also had strong surrealistic and psychedelic overtones. George Martin, the Beatles' producer, recalled that when he first heard "Strawberry Fields Forever", he thought it conjured up a "hazy, impressionistic dreamworld". (Note: Martin described Lennon's initial performance of the song, on acoustic guitar, as "magic [...] absolutely lovely".)

As with his Revolver compositions "Tomorrow Never Knows" and "She Said She Said", "Strawberry Fields Forever" was informed by Lennon's experiences with the hallucinogenic drug LSD, which caused him to question his identity and seek to dissolve his ego. In Turner's description, the song's opening line, "Let me take you down", establishes Lennon as a "spiritual leader" in keeping with his statements in "The Word", "Rain" and "Tomorrow Never Knows", while Lennon's contention that in Strawberry Field "Nothing is real" reflects the concept of maya (or "illusion") as conveyed in the Hindu teachings that Lennon was also reading during his weeks on the film set. Lennon said the song reflected how he had felt "different all my life"; he called it "psychoanalysis set to music" and one of his most honest songs. In McCartney's view, the lyrics reflect Lennon's admiration of the nineteenth-century English writer Lewis Carroll, particularly his poem "Jabberwocky".

The earliest demo of the song was recorded in Almería, and Lennon subsequently developed the melody and lyrics in England throughout November. Demos taped at his home, Kenwood, demonstrate his progress with the song and include parts played on a Mellotron, a tape-replay keyboard instrument he had purchased in August 1965. On the first Almería recording, the song had no refrain and only one verse, beginning: "There's no one on my wavelength / I mean, it's either too high or too low". Lennon revised these words to make them more obscure, then wrote the melody and part of the lyrics to the chorus (which functioned as a bridge and did not yet include a reference to Strawberry Fields). After returning to England in early November, he added another verse and the mention of Strawberry Fields. The first verse on the released version was the last to be written, close to the time of the song's recording. For the chorus, Lennon was again inspired by his childhood memories: the words "nothing to get hung about" were inspired by Aunt Mimi's strict order not to play in the grounds of Strawberry Field, to which Lennon replied, "They can't hang you for it." The first verse Lennon wrote became the second one in the released version of the song, and the second verse he wrote became the last.

== Composition ==
"Strawberry Fields Forever" sample

"Strawberry Fields Forever" was originally written on acoustic guitar in the key of C major. The recorded version was not in standard pitch after the tape speed was manipulated and the key is approximately B♭ major. Among musicologists, Walter Everett describes it as "midway between" A and B♭ over the opening minute and subsequently "closer to B♭", while Dominic Pedler says that some consider it to be closer to A major.

The song begins with a flute-like introduction played on Mellotron, and involves a I–ii–I–♭VII–IV progression (in Roman numeral analysis). The vocals enter with the chorus instead of a verse. In Pedler's description, it has "non-diatonic chords and secondary dominants" combining with "chromatic melodic tension intensified through outrageous harmonisation and root movement". The phrase "to Strawberry" begins with a slightly dissonant G melody note against a prevailing F minor key, then uses the semitone dissonance B♭ and B notes (the natural and sharpened 11th degrees against the Fm chord) until the consonant F note is reached on "Fields". The same series of mostly dissonant melody notes covers the phrase "nothing is real" against the prevailing G^{7} chord (F♯^{7} in the key of A).

A half-bar complicates the metre of the choruses, as does the fact that the vocals begin in the middle of the first bar. The first verse follows the chorus and is eight bars long. The verse starts with an F major chord, which progresses to G minor, the submediant, serving as a deceptive cadence. According to musicologist Alan Pollack, the deceptive cadence is encountered in the verse, as the leading-tone never resolves into a I chord directly as expected. Instead, the leading note, harmonised as part of the dominant chord, resolves to the prevailing tonic (B♭) at the end of the verse, after tonicising the subdominant (IV) E♭ chord, on "disagree". On the released recording, the second and third verses are introduced by a descending, raga-esque melody played on an Indian board-mounted zither, known as a swarmandal.

In the middle of the second chorus, brass is introduced, emphasising an ominous quality in the lyrics. After three verses and four choruses, the line "Strawberry Fields Forever" is repeated three times, and the song fades out, with interplay between electric guitar, cello and swarmandal. The song fades back in after a few seconds for what Everett terms a "free-form coda". This avant-garde-style section features the Mellotron playing in a haunting tone – one achieved by recording the instrument's "Swinging Flutes" setting in reverse – scattered drumming, discordant brass, and murmuring, after which the song fades for a second time.

== Recording ==
=== Overview ===
External videos
- "Strawberry Fields Forever" (Take 1)
- "Strawberry Fields Forever" (Take 4)
- "Strawberry Fields Forever" (Take 7)
- "Strawberry Fields Forever" (Take 26)

The Beatles began recording "Strawberry Fields Forever" on 24 November 1966. It was the band's first recording session since completing Revolver, in June, and marked the start of recording for what became the 1967 album Sgt. Pepper's Lonely Hearts Club Band. It was also the Beatles' first group activity since the end of their final US tour, on 29 August. Recording took place in Studio 2 at EMI Studios (now Abbey Road Studios) in London, using a four-track machine.

Before the session, in October, Brian Epstein, the Beatles' manager, had informed EMI that the band would not be releasing any new music for the Christmas market. On 10 November, newspapers reported that there would be no further concert tours by the Beatles. The band's lack of activity and their highly publicised individual pursuits since September were interpreted by the press as a sign that the band were on the verge of splitting up. Their return to the recording studio was given front-page coverage in some newspapers.

George Harrison, who had been travelling in India during the Beatles' lay-off, recalled there being a "more profound ambience" in the band when they reunited to record "Strawberry Fields Forever". Lennon said that, having failed to connect with anyone on Lester's film set, "I was never so glad to see the others. Seeing them made me feel normal again." The song's working title was "It's Not Too Bad". The song took 45 hours to record, spread over five weeks. It was the most complex recording the Beatles had attempted up to this point, and involved three distinct versions of the song; each one was different in structure, key and tempo, yet the released recording was created through a combination of the final two versions.

Together with "Penny Lane" and "When I'm Sixty-Four", "Strawberry Fields Forever" established the theme for the early part of the Sgt. Pepper project – namely, a nostalgic look back at the band members' childhoods in northern England. McCartney has said that this was never planned or formalised as an album-wide concept, but acknowledged that it served as a "device" or underlying theme throughout the project. (Note: Author Ian MacDonald identifies allusions to the Beatles' upbringing throughout Sgt. Pepper that are "too persuasive to ignore". These include evocations of the postwar Northern music hall tradition, references to Northern industrial towns and Liverpool schooldays, Lewis Carroll-inspired imagery, the use of brass instrumentation in the style of park bandstand performances such as at Sefton Park, and the album cover's flower arrangement akin to a floral clock.)

=== Take 1 ===
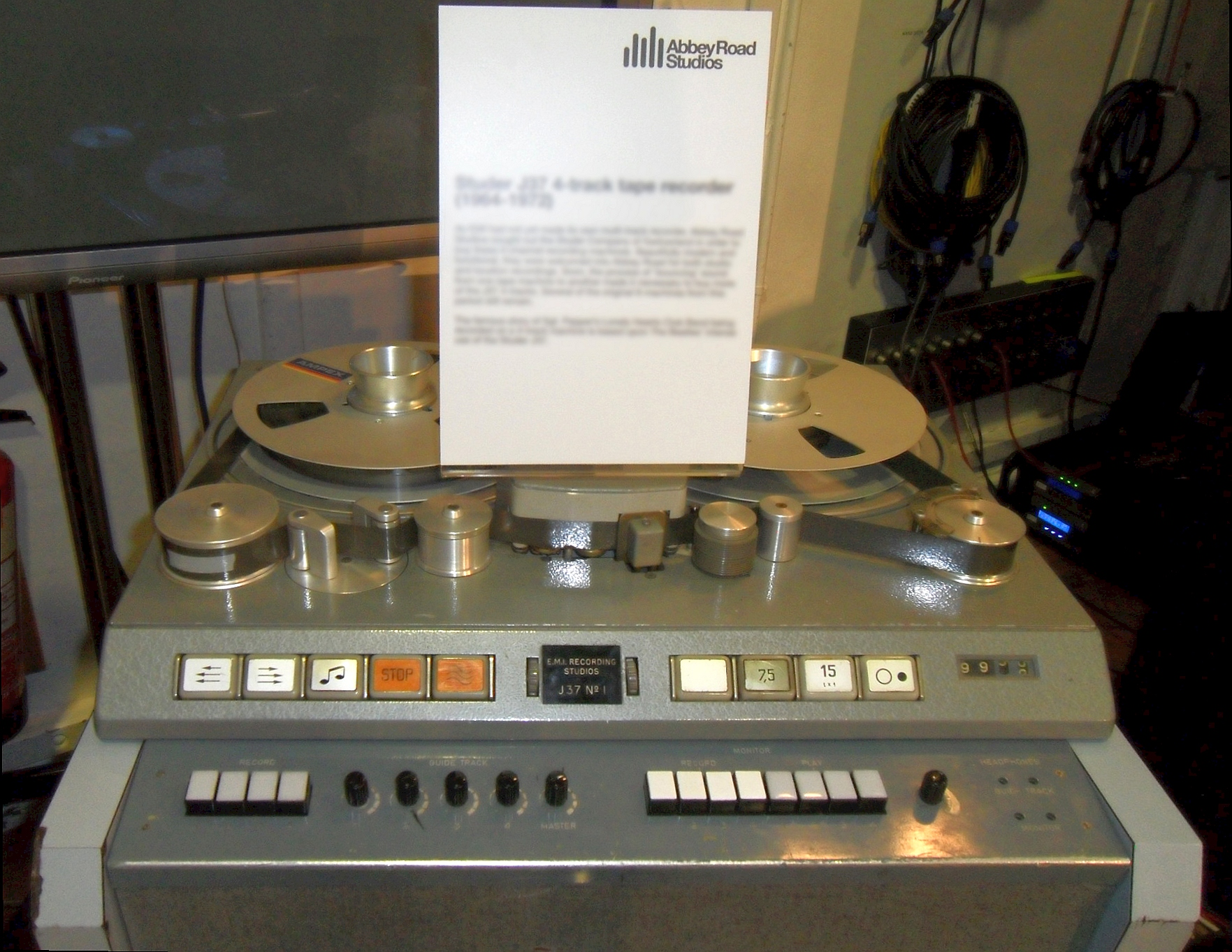
"Strawberry Fields Forever" was one of the most technically complex recordings the Beatles ever attempted. The song was recorded entirely on a Studer J37 four-track machine.

After Lennon played the song for the other Beatles on his acoustic guitar, on 24 November, he changed to his Epiphone Casino electric guitar for the recordings. McCartney played Mellotron, which, following Lennon's lead, the other three Beatles had acquired their own examples of, through the Moody Blues' keyboardist, Mike Pinder. Harrison also played electric guitar, emphasising a bass line beside Lennon's rhythm, and Ringo Starr played drums. McCartney wrote the melody for the Mellotron introduction, although on the first take the instrument appears more in the role of backing accompaniment, relative to its prominence on the officially released recording. (Note: Although "Strawberry Fields Forever" is primarily Lennon's composition, in 1967 Lennon said that McCartney had contributed to the song, just as he had helped McCartney complete "Penny Lane".)

Take 1 opened with a verse, starting "Living is easy with eyes closed", instead of the chorus, which starts the released version. The first verse also led directly to the second, with no chorus between. Lennon's vocals were automatically double-tracked from the words "Strawberry Fields Forever" through the end of the last verse. The last verse, beginning "Always, no sometimes", has three-part harmonies, with McCartney and Harrison singing "dreamy background vocals". Onto this take 1, Harrison also overdubbed slide guitar parts over the choruses, played on the Mellotron's guitar setting and using the instrument's pitch control to achieve the slide effect. This version was soon abandoned; it went unreleased until a new mix was included on the Anthology 2 outtakes compilation in 1996, although the harmony vocals were cut from the track. (Note: In 2017, a version of the take with the harmony vocals restored was released on the 50th anniversary super-deluxe edition of Sgt. Pepper, with a section of the original warm-up added.)

=== Take 7 ===
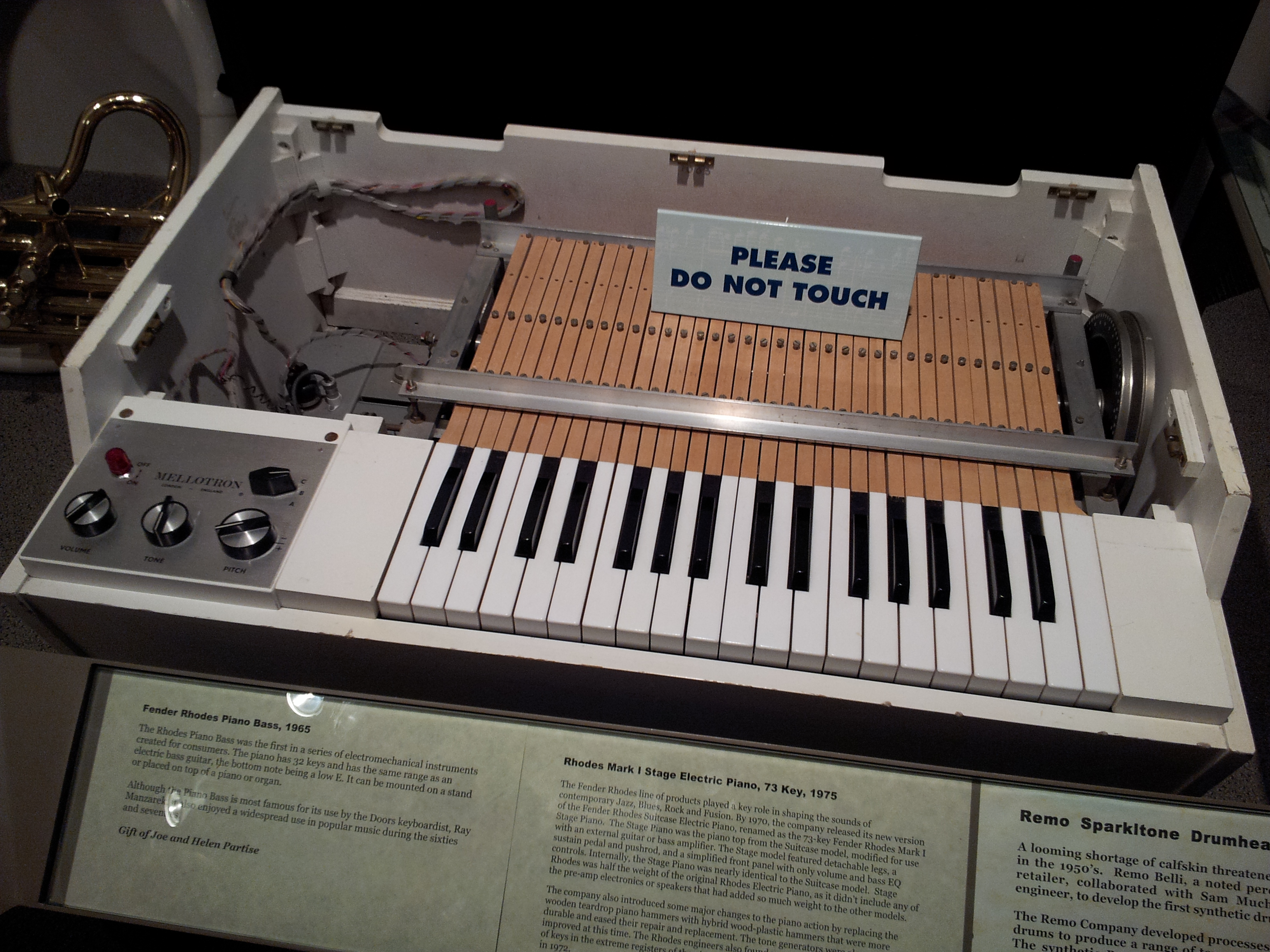
A 1960s-era Mellotron, similar to that used on the Beatles recording

On 28 November, the band reassembled to try a different arrangement. The second version of the song featured McCartney's Mellotron introduction followed by the chorus. The instrumentation on the basic track was similar to that for take 1, but with the inclusion of maracas. Take 4 was considered sufficient for mix down and overdubs, which included a lead vocal by Lennon, McCartney's bass guitar, and Harrison again playing the slide parts, including what author John Winn terms "Morse code blips", on Mellotron.

Having taken acetates home overnight, the band decided to redo the song again on 29 November, using the same arrangement. The second take that day was chosen as best and subjected to overdubs, such as vocal and bass guitar. In his lead guitar part, Harrison plays arpeggio chord patterns, after Lennon had struggled to master the picking technique. Lennon's vocal was recorded with the tape running fast so that when played back at normal speed the tonality would be altered, giving his voice a slurred sound.

During the subsequent mix-down process, creating what became take 7, Lennon added a second vocal over the choruses. The other final overdubs were piano and further bass. (Note: Joseph Brennan, a Columbia University researcher who wrote an expansive study of the recording of "Strawberry Fields Forever", questions part of Beatles historian Mark Lewisohn's description of the track. While Brennan makes no mention of piano on take 7 but includes a second bass part, Winn omits either of these and instead writes that an overdub on "Mellotron (piano and guitar settings)" was among the last additions to take 7.) This version would be used only for the first minute of the released recording.

=== Take 26 ===
After recording the second version of the song, Lennon wanted to do something different with it. Martin recalled: "He'd wanted it as a gentle dreaming song, but he said it had come out too raucous. He asked me if I could write him a new line-up with the strings. So I wrote a new score (with four trumpets and three cellos) ..." For this purpose, another basic track was recorded on 8 and 9 December, with the group attempting the song at a faster tempo than before. At the start of the first session, recording was overseen by Dave Harries, an EMI technical engineer, in the temporary absence of Martin and Geoff Emerick, the Beatles' usual recording engineer. The band focused on achieving a percussion-heavy rhythm track, which included Starr's drums, and backwards-recorded hi-hat and cymbals. The latter process involved writing down the parts before Starr played them, as Harrison had done for his backwards guitar solo on "I'm Only Sleeping". Described by Winn as a "cacophony of noise", the 8 December tape also included timpani and bongos, played by McCartney and Harrison, and other percussion, which, in Harries' account, was provided by Beatles associates Mal Evans, Neil Aspinall and Terry Doran.

At the start of the 9 December session, parts of two of the fifteen new takes were edited together into one performance, which was then mixed down to a single track on the four-track master. The second of those takes (numbered take 24) consisted of the heavy drum break and accompanying percussion used over the song's coda, and included Lennon's spoken comments "Calm down, Ringo" and "Cranberry sauce". In Lewisohn's description, further percussion, including a pounding drum part by Starr, and Harrison's swarmandal were recorded onto one of the available tracks at this time. (Note: Harrison's use of swarmandal marked the instrument's introduction into Western pop music. It had 21 strings, which he tuned specifically to suit the part.) Other overdubs, which appear towards the end of the track, included lead guitar (played by McCartney), piano and the coda's reversed Mellotron flutes. (Note: Over this ending, marked by the end of the final chorus, Everett identifies swarmandal as the instrument that interplays with the cellos and electric guitar, as does Richie Unterberger. Alternatively, according to authors Jean-Michel Guesdon and Philippe Margotin, the zither-like sound from 3:00 onwards was created by plucking the strings inside a piano.) From the evidence of bootlegs available by 2009, Winn dates the addition of swarmandal to after Martin's orchestral overdubs. With regard to the main piano part, he describes it as the Mellotron's "'piano riff' tape", rather than a genuine instrumental contribution.

The session for Martin's brass and cello arrangement took place on 15 December. The group included cellist Joy Hall, sometimes mistakenly credited as 'John' Hall. Her performance made her the first woman to appear on a Beatles song. The parts were performed in the key of C major but taped so that on playback they sounded in B major. Another mix down was then carried out, reducing all the contributions to two tape tracks. Author Ian MacDonald comments that Martin's contribution heightens the song's Indian qualities, as represented first by the swarmandal, through his scoring of the cellos to "[weave] exotically" around McCartney's "sitar-like" guitar figures before the coda. Further overdubs, on what was now named take 26, were two vocal parts by Lennon, the second one doubling the main vocal over the choruses. Lennon re-recorded one of his vocals on 21 December, singing a harmony over the final chorus. Some piano was also added at this time, along with a snare drum part.

=== Final edit ===
After reviewing the acetates of the new remake and the previous version, Lennon told Martin that he liked both the "original, lighter" take 7 and "the intense, scored version", and wanted to combine the two. Martin had to tell Lennon that the orchestral score was at a faster tempo and in a higher key than the earlier recording. Lennon assured him: "You can fix it, George."

On 22 December, Martin and Emerick carried out the difficult task of joining takes 7 and 26 together. With only a pair of editing scissors, two tape machines and a vari-speed control, Emerick compensated for the differences in key and speed by increasing the speed of the first version and decreasing the speed of the second. He then spliced the versions, starting the orchestral score in the middle of the second chorus. Since take 7 did not include a chorus after the first verse, he also spliced in the first seven words of the second chorus from that take. The pitch-shifting in joining the versions gave Lennon's lead vocal an otherworldly, "swimming" quality.

During the editing process, the portion towards the end of take 26, before the arrival of the reversed Mellotron flutes and siren-like trumpet blasts, was faded out temporarily, creating a false ending. On the completed take from 15 December, however, the swarmandal and other sounds were interrupted by the abrupt entrance of the coda's heavy drum and percussion piece. Martin said that the premature fadeout was his idea, to hide some errors in the busy percussion track. Among the faintly audible comments over the coda, "Cranberry sauce" was taken to be Lennon intoning "I buried Paul" by proponents of the "Paul is Dead" hoax, a theory that contended that McCartney had died in November 1966 and been replaced in the Beatles by a lookalike.

Shortly before his death in 1980, Lennon expressed dissatisfaction with the final version of the song, saying it was "badly recorded" and accusing McCartney of subconsciously sabotaging the recording. Martin remained proud of the track; he described it as "a complete tone poem – like a modern Debussy".

== Promotional film ==
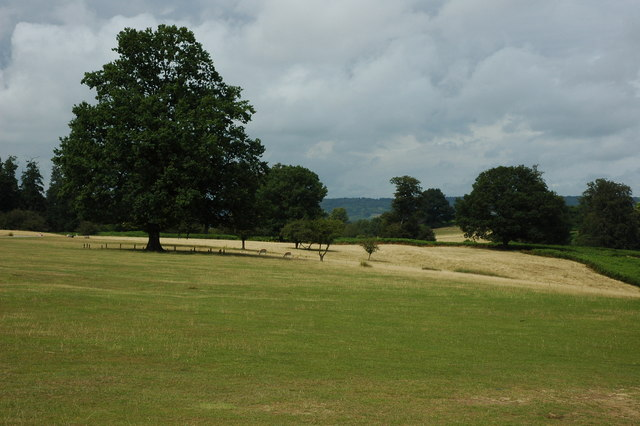
The Beatles filmed their promo clip for the song around a large tree in Knole Park in Kent.

By January 1967, Epstein was under pressure from the Beatles' record company to release a new single by the group. Martin told him that they had recorded "Strawberry Fields Forever" and "Penny Lane", which, in his opinion, were "two all-time great songs". The decision was made to issue them as a double A-side single, a format the Beatles had used for their previous single, "Eleanor Rigby" / "Yellow Submarine", in August 1966. The Beatles produced a film clip for "Strawberry Fields Forever", in a continuation of their policy since 1965 of avoiding the need to promote a single with numerous personal appearances on television. It was filmed on 30 and 31 January 1967 at Knole Park in Sevenoaks, Kent. The following week, the band shot part of the promotional film for "Penny Lane" at the same location. (Note: While in Sevenoaks, Lennon wandered into an antiques shop and purchased the poster for Pablo Fanque's Circus Royal that would inspire his song "Being for the Benefit of Mr. Kite!")

The clip was directed by Peter Goldmann, a Swedish television director who had drawn inspiration in his work from Lester's style in the Beatles' 1964 film A Hard Day's Night. Goldmann was recommended to the Beatles by their mutual friend Klaus Voormann. One of the band's assistants, Tony Bramwell, served as producer. Bramwell recalls that, inspired by Voormann's comment on hearing "Strawberry Fields Forever" – that "the whole thing sounded like it was played on a strange instrument" – he spent two days dressing up a large tree in the park to resemble "a piano and harp combined, with strings". Writing in 2007, music critic John Harris remarked that Bramwell's set design reflected the "collision of serenity and almost gothic eeriness" evident in the finished song.

The clip presented the Beatles' new group image, since all four now sported moustaches, following Harrison's lead when he left for India in September 1966. In addition to a horseshoe moustache, Lennon wore his round "granny" glasses for the first time as a member of the Beatles, in keeping with his look as Private Gripweed in How I Won the War, for which he had also shorn off his long hair. Combined with their psychedelic clothing, the band's appearance contrasted sharply with the youthful "moptop" image of their touring years; this former image and identity had instead been adopted by the Monkees, an American television and recording act based on the Beatles as they had appeared in A Hard Day's Night and Help! (Note: During the Knole Park shoot, Lennon repeatedly sang "Hey hey, we're the Monkees", from the theme song for The Monkees, to teenagers who had come to watching the Beatles filming.) In author Kevin Courrier's description, Lennon now resembled a character from an Arthur Conan Doyle mystery, while Harrison looked equally austere, with his beard and long hair.

McCartney, Harrison, Starr and Lennon pouring paint over the piano–harp construction. Journalist and broadcaster Joe Cushley describes the clip as "the mad music professors' outdoor seminar".

Instead of a performance of the song, the clip relies on abstract imagery and features reverse film effects, long dissolves, jump-cuts including from day- to night-time, superimposition and extreme close-up shots. (Note: The non-performance aspect of the two Beatles promos was in response to the Musicians' Union's ban on miming on television.) The Beatles are shown playing and later pouring paint over the upright piano; at one point, McCartney appears to leap from the ground onto a branch of the tree. (Note: Discussing the clip in The Rolling Stone Book of Rock Video, Michael Shore said it was "Richard Lester meets Kenneth Anger in the Twilight Zone".) In his commentary on the promo clip, music critic Chris Ingham writes:

Beautifully and spookily lit [...] much attention is given to close-ups of The Beatles' faces and facial hair, as if the viewer is invited to contemplate the significance of the newly furry Fabs. There's an appropriately surreal air about the film [...] which, when experienced simultaneously with The Beatles' extraordinary new music, is deliciously disorientating. The final scene of The Beatles pouring pots of coloured paint onto the "piano" is oddly shocking, but brilliantly memorable as a statement of iconoclastic artistic intent.

The Beatles standing by a tree and the broken piano–harp construction

== Release ==
The reaction when you played "Strawberry Fields [Forever]" to people was weird [...] "Penny Lane" was a bit Beatley; "Strawberry Fields" really wasn't.

— Beatles associate Tony Bramwell

The double A-side single was issued by Capitol Records in the US on 13 February 1967 (as Capitol 5810), and by EMI's Parlophone label in the United Kingdom on 17 February (as Parlophone R 5570). Aside from the compilation album A Collection of Beatles Oldies, issued in the UK but not the US, it was the first release by the Beatles since Revolver and their August 1966 single. It was also the first Beatles single in the UK to be presented in a picture sleeve, with the first 250,000 copies being distributed in this format. The front of the sleeve contained a studio photo that again demonstrated the band's adoption of facial hair; on the back cover were individual pictures of the four Beatles as infants, which heightened the connection to a Liverpool childhood. Recalling the reaction to the new single and the expectations it created for Sgt. Pepper, music critic Greil Marcus later wrote: "If this extraordinary music was merely a taste of what The Beatles were up to, what would the album be like?" Comparing the two sides in his book Electric Shock, Peter Doggett likens "Penny Lane" to pop art in its evoking "multifaceted substance out of the everyday", and describes "Strawberry Fields Forever" as art pop, "self-consciously excluding the mass audience".

The promotional film for "Strawberry Fields Forever" was the more experimental of Goldmann's clips and underlined the Beatles' ties to the avant-garde scene. The band's new look was the focus of much scrutiny, as promotion for the single and its musical content left many listeners unable to recognise the act as the Beatles. The films were first broadcast in America on The Ed Sullivan Show and in Britain on Top of the Pops, a day before the respective release dates in those two countries. Plans to debut the films on Juke Box Jury were abandoned after the BBC refused Epstein's request to air them in full. On 25 February, they aired on The Hollywood Palace, a traditional US variety program hosted by actor Van Johnson. Amid screams from female members of the studio audience, Johnson bemusedly introduced "Strawberry Fields Forever" with the comment: "It's a musical romp through an open field with psychedelic overtones and a feeling of expanded consciousness [...] If you know what that means, let me know". The films attracted a similar level of confusion on the more youth-focused American Bandstand, on 11 March, where Dick Clark invited comments from his studio audience. In the description of author Doyle Greene, the varied opinions towards the "rebranded 'counterculture Beatles'" and their new music demonstrated a "gendering" of popular culture: male reaction was marginally more favourable than female, and women variously focused on the "weird", "ugly" or "grandfather"-like appearance of the band members. Courrier says the hostility towards "Strawberry Fields Forever" was reflective of how pop fans felt abandoned by the Beatles, with one teenager commenting that the group had turned "deliberately weird" and "ought to stop being so clever and give us tunes we can enjoy". (Note: Referring to this American Bandstand screening, Winn says that the "bewildered reaction [...] to the song and the group's new look has to be seen to be believed". Three of the four teenagers were troubled by the clip; the fourth, a young male, said with a broad smile: "I thought it was just great.")

In Britain, "Strawberry Fields Forever" / "Penny Lane" was the first Beatles single since "Please Please Me" in 1963 to fail to reach number 1 on Record Retailer's chart (later the UK Singles Chart). (Note: There was no standardised UK chart until February 1969, when it was established through the British Market Research Bureau. The Official Charts Company recognises the listings published by Record Retailer from March 1960 onwards as representing the UK Singles Chart for that period.) It was held at number 2 behind Engelbert Humperdinck's "Release Me", the year's biggest-selling single. (In George Martin's book Summer of Love he claims the two songs were counted as two separate singles on the chart, severely hampering the record's chances of reaching the top; however, none of the UK's charts listed the two sides separately, including the Record Retailer chart, and so being defined as a double A-side cannot have affected the single's chart position.) Following the speculation that the Beatles were due to disband, their failure to secure the number 1 spot was trumpeted in the UK press as a sign that the group's popularity was declining. At the time, McCartney said he was not upset because Humperdinck's song was a "completely different type of thing", while Harrison acknowledged that "Strawberry Fields Forever", like all of the Beatles' latest music, was bound to alienate much of their audience but would also win them new fans. (Note: Starr recalled that the single's failure to top the chart was "a relief" because "it took the pressure off". He likened it to the relief he initially felt in September 1969 when, following Lennon's lead, the Beatles agreed to disband.) On the national chart compiled by Melody Maker magazine, however, the combination topped the singles list for three weeks.

On the US Billboard Hot 100 the two sides of a single were counted separately whether defined as a double A-side or not (for example, "She's a Woman" reached number 4 in 1964 despite being a B-side). "Penny Lane" topped the chart for one week, while "Strawberry Fields Forever" peaked at number 8. "Penny Lane" was the side favoured by chart compilers in Australia, where the single was number 1 for five weeks. The single was also number 1 in Canada and Norway, and peaked at number 4 in France.

== Critical reception ==
Among contemporary reviews of the single, Melody Maker said that the combination of musical instruments, studio techniques and vocal effect on "Strawberry Fields Forever" created a "swooping, deep, mystic kaleidoscope of sound", and concluded, "The whole concept shows the Beatles in a new, far-out light." The NME's Derek Johnson confessed to being both fascinated and confused by the track, writing: "Certainly the most unusual and way-out single The Beatles have yet produced – both in lyrical content and scoring. Quite honestly, I don't really know what to make of it." According to Beatles biographer Robert Rodriguez, Johnson's comments typified the "bewilderment" and "mood of disquiet" that the song initially aroused in the music press. The Daily Mail's entertainment reporter wrote: "What's happening to the Beatles? They have become contemplative, secretive, exclusive and excluded – four mystics with moustaches."

In the United States, the single's experimental qualities initiated an upsurge in the ongoing critical discourse on the aesthetics and artistry of pop music, as, centring on the Beatles' work, writers sought to elevate pop in the cultural landscape for the first time. Among these laudatory appraisals, Time magazine hailed the song as "the latest sample of the Beatles' astonishing inventiveness". The writer said that, since 1963:

[The] Beatles have developed into the single most creative force in pop music. Wherever they go, the pack follows. And where they have gone in recent months, not even their most ardent supporters would ever have dreamed of. They have bridged the heretofore impassable gap between rock and classical, mixing elements of Bach, Oriental and electronic music with vintage twang to achieve the most compellingly original sounds ever heard in pop music.

Time concluded by saying that the multitude of "dissonances and eerie space-age sounds" on the track were partly the product of altered tape speed and direction, and commented: "This is nothing new to electronic composers, but employing such methods in a pop song is electrifying." In his review of Sgt. Pepper in June 1967, William Mann of The Times recognised the Beatles as the originators of the vogue for "electronically-manipulated clusters of sound", and he added: "In some records, it's just a generalised effect. But in 'Strawberry Fields', it was poetically and precisely applied."

Richie Unterberger of AllMusic describes "Strawberry Fields Forever" as "one of The Beatles' peak achievements and one of the finest Lennon–McCartney songs". Ian MacDonald wrote in his book Revolution in the Head that it "shows expression of a high order [...] few if any [contemporary composers] are capable of displaying feeling and fantasy so direct, spontaneous, and original." According to music critic Tim Riley, the song "transformed Lennon's creative arc" by "expand[ing] the hallucinogenic drone of 'Rain' into layered colours that shifted when lit by his vocal inflections" and by inaugurating his use of free-form verse as a lyrical device. Riley adds that while it represented Lennon's "first glimpse of life" outside the Beatles, "part of the recording's ironic pull lies in how the Beatles drape a group sensibility around Lennon's abstract psyche, something only the most intimate of musical friends could do." In his commentary on the track in The Beatles' Diary, Peter Doggett describes the song as "the greatest pop record ever made" and "a record that never dates, because it lives outside time". He rues the single's failure to top the now-official UK chart as "arguably the most disgraceful statistic in chart history".

== Cultural influence and legacy ==
=== Reactions from contemporaries ===
Featuring backwards cymbals, cascading Indian harp [...] guitar solos, timpani, bongos, trumpets and cellos, this was the lushest music The Beatles had recorded up to then [...] From its weird Mellotron opening to its fake drum forward reprise where John's voice could be heard saying "Cranberry sauce", "Strawberry Fields Forever" inaugurated 1967 like no other song on earth.

— Author Mark Prendergast, 2003

Upon the single's release, the Who's Pete Townshend, a regular on London's psychedelic club scene, described "Strawberry Fields Forever" as "utterly bizarre, creative, strange and different". Mark Lindsay of the US band Paul Revere & the Raiders listened to the single at home with his producer, Terry Melcher; as "the song ended we both just looked at each other. I said, 'Now what the fuck are we gonna do?' With that single, the Beatles raised the ante as to what a pop record should be." Lindsay said he then ensured that the clips for both songs were broadcast on the Raiders' television show, Where the Action Is.

In a famous anecdote, Brian Wilson, who had been struggling to complete the Beach Boys' Smile album, first heard "Strawberry Fields Forever" on his car radio while under the influence of barbiturates. In the recollection of his passenger at the time, Michael Vosse, "[Wilson] just shook his head and said, 'They did it already – what I wanted to do with Smile. Maybe it's too late.'" Vosse recalled that they then exchanged laughter, although "at the moment he said it, he sounded very serious." According to author Steven Gaines, the "wondrous and different-sounding" quality of the Beatles' single was one of several factors that accelerated Wilson's emotional descent and led to him abandoning Smile. In response to a fan's question on his website in 2014, Wilson denied that hearing the song had "weakened" him and called it a "very weird record" that he enjoyed.

"Strawberry Fields Forever" is featured in its near-entirety in Canadian structural film director Michael Snow's 1967 film Wavelength, playing on a radio in a room that is gradually zoomed in on through the course of the film. It was filmed in December 1966, but Snow began editing it in early 1967 and was significantly drawn to the song when it was released, choosing to overdub it over a song playing in the original footage.

=== Psychedelia, recording and music videos ===
The song was influential on psychedelic rock and, in Chris Ingham's description, it established "the standard and style for the entire psychedelic pop movement that would follow". Ian MacDonald recognises the track as having "extended the range of studio techniques developed on Revolver, opening up possibilities for pop which, given sufficient invention, could result in unprecedented sound images". He views it as having launched both the "English pop-pastoral mood" typified by bands such as Pink Floyd, Family, Traffic and Fairport Convention, and English psychedelia's LSD-inspired preoccupation with "nostalgia for the innocent vision of a child". Among other music historians, Simon Philo describes much of Pink Floyd's first album, The Piper at the Gates of Dawn (1967), as being in the style of the "patented British psychedelia" introduced by "Strawberry Fields Forever". David Howard says the production was a "direct touchstone" for Pink Floyd, the Move, the Smoke and other bands in London's upcoming psychedelic scene.

Although the Mellotron had been a feature of Manfred Mann's late 1966 hit single "Semi-Detached Suburban Mr James", its appearance on "Strawberry Fields Forever" remains the most celebrated use of the instrument on a pop or rock recording. Mike Pinder, whose band the Moody Blues went on to make extensive use of Mellotron and swarmandal in their work, said he was "in bliss" when he heard the keyboard's flute sound on the Beatles' single. Together with the resonant tone of Starr's drums, the cello arrangement on "Strawberry Fields Forever", as with "I Am the Walrus", was much admired by other musicians and producers, and proved highly influential on 1970s bands such as Electric Light Orchestra and Wizzard.

Walter Everett identifies the song's ending as an example of the Beatles' continued pioneering of the "fade-out–fade-in coda", further to their use of this device on the 1966 B-side "Rain". He cites "Helter Skelter" as a later example, as well as Led Zeppelin's 1969 track "Thank You" and, as a direct response to the Beatles' lead, both sides of the Rolling Stones' August 1967 single, "We Love You" and "Dandelion". According to historian David Simonelli, further to "Tomorrow Never Knows" in 1966, "Strawberry Fields Forever" and "Penny Lane" "establish[ed] the Beatles as the most avant-garde [pop] composers of the postwar era". He also says that the single heralded the group's brand of Romanticism as a central tenet of psychedelic rock, which ensured that "The Beatles' vision dominated the entire rock music world." In his contribution to the book In Their Lives: Great Writers on Great Beatles Songs, Adam Gopnik describes the single as the 1960s' most important work of art and "the one that articulated the era's hopes for a crossover of pop art and high intricacy".

Further to the band's pioneering use of promotional films since 1965, the clip for the song served as an early example of what became known as a music video. In 1985, the "Strawberry Fields Forever" and "Penny Lane" clips were the oldest selections included in the New York Museum of Modern Art (MoMA)'s exhibition of the most influential music videos. The two films occupied a similar place in MoMA's 2003 "Golden Oldies of Music Video" exhibition, where they were presented by avant-garde artist Laurie Anderson. (Note: In his book on the history of the music video, Saul Austerlitz recognises the two 1967 clips as superior to efforts by the Beatles' contemporaries and a development on the band's work with director Michael Lindsay-Hogg in 1966. He also says they lack a satisfactory resolution to the concepts and innovative ideas they introduce, however, and concludes: "The Beatles' videos laid the table for future music-video experiments in symbolism, but their own symbols were, for the most part, muddled and unclear.") The "Strawberry Fields Forever" clip also provided the inspiration for the start of the fan vidding phenomenon in 1975. Kandy Fong, influenced by the Beatles not attempting to perform the music, set images from the Star Trek TV series to an apparently unrelated musical soundtrack.

=== Strawberry Field, accolades and cultural depictions ===
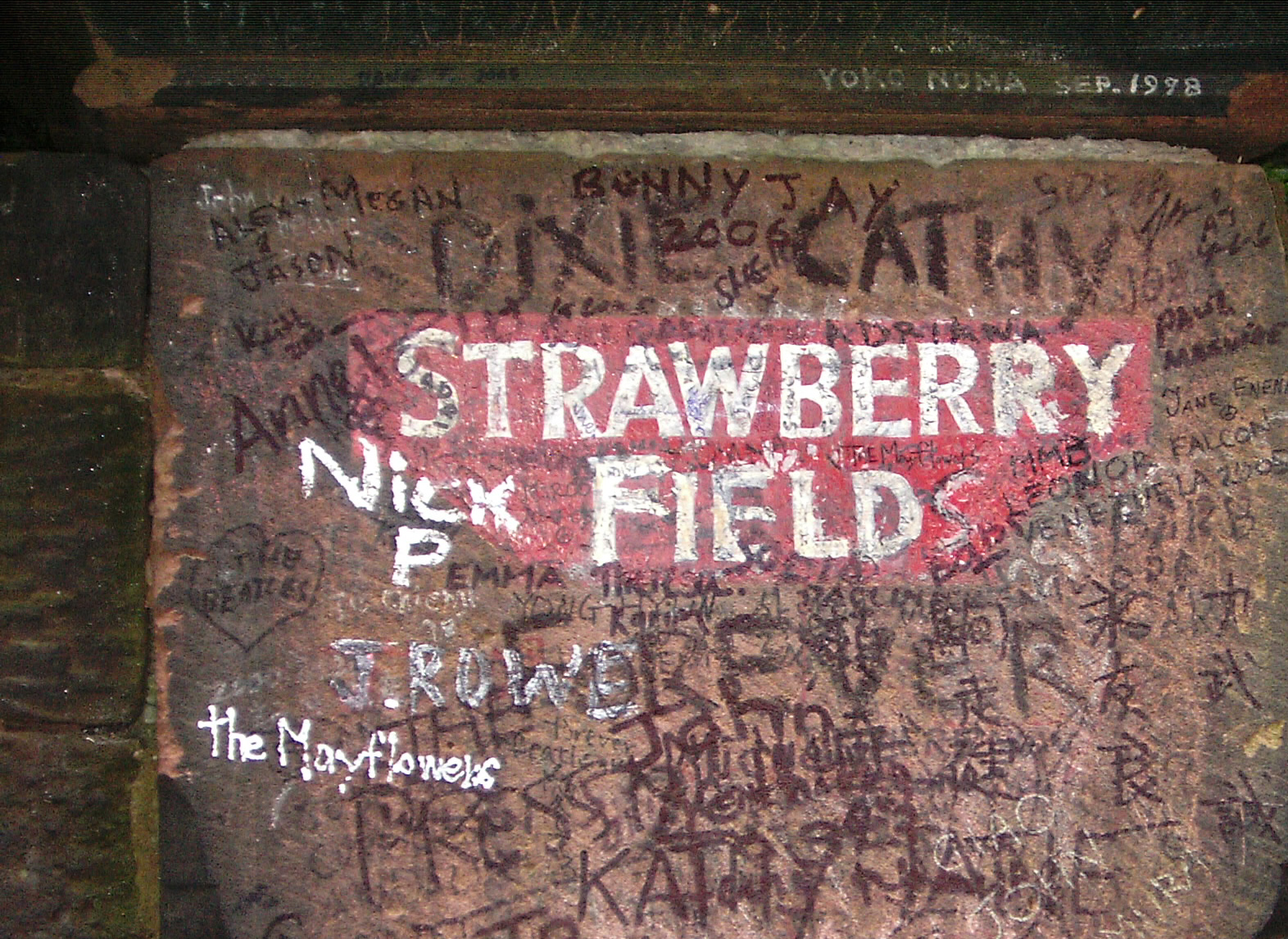
Heavily graffiti-ed gatepost sign at Strawberry Field – with the word "Forever" added in acknowledgement of the Beatles song

Strawberry Field became a popular visiting place for fans of Lennon and the Beatles as a result of the song. In 1975, the Liverpool Public Relations Office published a tourism media package titled Nothing to Get Hung About, which contained Beatles-related postcards and history, and a map of Liverpool. By 2011, the level of graffiti left by visitors at Strawberry Field had forced the Salvation Army to have the entrance gates removed and later relocated to the Beatles Experience centre in Liverpool. (Note: The children's home closed in January 2005. On his death in December 1980, Lennon left money to Strawberry Field in his will, and in 1984 his widow, Yoko Ono, donated £50,000 to help maintain the home.) In July 2017, the Salvation Army began raising funds – through the sale of T-shirts and mugs emblazoned with "Nothing is real" and other lines from Lennon's lyrics – to help finance the construction of a new building at Strawberry Field. The purpose of the building is to help provide job opportunities for young adults with learning difficulties, and to commemorate Lennon, in both an indoor exhibition and a "garden of spiritual reflection".

The Strawberry Fields memorial in New York's Central Park is named after the song. The memorial and the Strawberry Fields area of the park, spanning 3.5 acres (1.4 ha), was officially dedicated by Yoko Ono in Lennon's memory in October 1985. (Note: The song also inspired the title of the most widely known of the Beatles' many US fanzines, Strawberry Fields Forever. Its publisher, Joe Pope, organised the prototype for the official Beatles fan conventions (such as Beatlefest) with an event held in Boston, Massachusetts in July 1974.) In addition to referencing "Strawberry Fields Forever" in its title, the 2013 Spanish film Living Is Easy with Eyes Closed is a fictional account based on real-life events when a 41-year-old teacher from Cartagena visited Lennon in Almería when he was writing the song.

"Strawberry Fields Forever" is one of the Rock and Roll Hall of Fame's "500 Songs That Shaped Rock and Roll" and in 1999 was inducted into the National Academy of Recording Arts and Sciences' Grammy Hall of Fame. In the June 1997 issue of Mojo magazine, Jon Savage included "Strawberry Fields Forever" in his list "Psychedelia: The 100 Greatest Classics" and wrote: "When this first came on radio in early 1967, it sounded like nothing else, with its wracked vocal, out-of-tune brass section and queasy strings." In 2004, Rolling Stone ranked the track at number 76 on its list of the "500 Greatest Songs of All Time", a placing the song retained in the magazine's 2011 list, then was re-ranked at number 7 on its 2021 list, the band's highest placement. On a similar list compiled by Q in 2006, it appeared at number 31. In 2010, Rolling Stone placed "Strawberry Fields Forever" at number 3 on its list of the "100 Greatest Beatles Songs". It was ranked as the second-best Beatles song by Mojo in 2006, after "A Day in the Life".

== Subsequent releases and remixes ==
In keeping with the Beatles' usual philosophy that tracks released on a single should not appear on new albums, both "Strawberry Fields Forever" and "Penny Lane" were left off Sgt. Pepper's Lonely Hearts Club Band. Martin later stated that this was an approach that he had encouraged, and it was a "dreadful mistake". The Beatles were displeased that Capitol then included the two songs, along with the band's other non-album singles tracks from 1967, on the Magical Mystery Tour LP, which the company released as a full-length album, in contrast to the six-track double EP released in the UK and many other countries.

The stereo version of the Magical Mystery Tour LP contained a 29 December 1966 mix of "Strawberry Fields Forever", in which the trumpets and cellos pan abruptly from left to right at the point where takes 7 and 26 are joined. By the time the album was released on CD, this mix had been superseded by a stereo remix, originally prepared for a 1971 West German issue of Magical Mystery Tour, which omitted the panning effect at the join point, but added a right-to-left panning to the swarmandal scale introducing the second and third verses.

"Strawberry Fields Forever" was sequenced as the opening track of the 1973 compilation album The Beatles 1967–1970, and the single charted again in Britain, peaking at number 32, when EMI reissued all 22 of the Beatles' UK singles in March 1976. (Note: "Strawberry Fields Forever" was also among the Beatles tracks included on the soundtrack album to the 1988 documentary film Imagine: John Lennon.) In 1996, three previously unreleased versions of the song appeared on Anthology 2: one of Lennon's home demos from November 1966; an altered version of the first studio take; and the complete take 7, in mono, edited with an extension of the coda's drums and percussion track from 9 December. In 2006, a newly mixed version of the song was included on the album Love. This mash-up takes sections from an acoustic demo, take 1 and then take 26, and the ending incorporates elements from "Sgt. Pepper's Lonely Hearts Club Band", "In My Life", "I'm Only Sleeping", "Penny Lane", "Piggies" and "Hello, Goodbye". In 2015, the promo film was included in the three-disc versions (titled 1+) of the Beatles' 1 compilation. A new stereo mix was created by Giles Martin to accompany the clip. This version appeared on CD in 2017 on the two-disc and six-disc 50th-anniversary editions of Sgt. Pepper, together with a selection of outtakes from the "Strawberry Fields Forever" sessions, including a complete take 26.

== Personnel ==
According to Ian MacDonald, except where noted:

The Beatles

- John Lennon – vocals, rhythm guitar, bongos, Mellotron (end)
- Paul McCartney – Mellotron (take 7 portion), bass guitar, piano, lead guitar (end), timpani, bongos
- George Harrison – lead guitar (take 7 portion), Mellotron (slide guitar sound), swarmandal, timpani, maracas
- Ringo Starr – drums, percussion
- Uncredited – tack piano

Additional musicians

- George Martin – cello and trumpet arrangement
- Mal Evans – tambourine
- Neil Aspinall – güiro
- Terry Doran – maracas
- Tony Fisher – trumpet
- Greg Bowen – trumpet
- Derek Watkins – trumpet
- Stanley Roderick – trumpet
- Joy Hall – cello
- Derek Simpson – cello
- Norman Jones – cello

== Charts ==
| Chart (1967) | Peak position |
|---|---|
| Australian Go-Set National Top 40 | 1 |
| Austrian Singles Chart | 13 |
| Belgian Singles Chart (Wallonia) | 1 |
| Finland (Suomen virallinen lista) | 4 |
| Netherlands (Dutch Top 40) | 1 |
| Netherlands (Single Top 100) | 1 |
| New Zealand Listener Chart | 5 |
| Norwegian VG-lista Singles | 1 |
| Swedish Kvällstoppen Chart | 1 |
| UK Record Retailer Chart | 2 |
| US Billboard Hot 100 | 8 |
| US Cash Box Top 100 | 10 |

== Certifications ==
| Region | Certification | Certified units/sales |
|---|---|---|
| Japan | — | 200,000 |
| New Zealand (RMNZ) | Gold | 15,000^{‡} |
| United Kingdom (BPI) | Gold | 400,000^{‡} |
^{‡} Sales+streaming figures based on certification alone.

== Candy Flip version ==
"Strawberry Fields Forever"

Single by Candy Flip

from the album Madstock...
- B-side: "Can You Feel the Love"
- Released: 5 March 1990
- Genre: Synth-pop
- Length: 4:09
- Label: Debut Edge
- Songwriter: Lennon–McCartney
- Producers: Dizzie Dee, Ric Peet

Candy Flip singles chronology
| "Love Is Life" (1989) | "Strawberry Fields Forever" (1990) | "This Can Be Real" (1990) |

Music video
- "Strawberry Fields Forever" on YouTube

"Strawberry Fields Forever" returned to the charts in 1990 when the duo Candy Flip, one of the British acts associated with the Madchester revival of 1960s psychedelia and fashion, released an electronic version of the track. It peaked at number three on the UK Singles Chart in March that year, and number seven in Ireland. (Note: Following this, McCartney began including the song in his 1990 live performances as part of a "Lennon Medley". He first played it at the Lennon tribute concert organised by Ono and held at Liverpool's King's Dock on 28 June.) The recording was also popular on college and indie radio in the US, where it peaked at number 11 on the Modern Rock Tracks chart.

Bill Coleman from Billboard commented that the remake was "a stroke of genius", adding: "It's one of those records that make you say to yourself 'how come I didn't think of that' ... An esoteric reading and tasteful production carried by a lazy hip-hop beat. If picked up stateside this could (and deserves to) be massive!". In her contemporary review for The Network Forty, Diane Tameecha described the single as "what happens when Liverpool meets Manchester". She said that the track was an "instantly likable cover" on which "Relatively sparse accompaniment, in the form of Pet Shop Boys' keyboard sounds mixed with that now 'classic' house drum sound, lends a cool flavor to the old Fab Four workhorse." Dele Fadele from NME declared it as a "cheeky update", that "shook TOTP to the rafters". In his review of Candy Flip's debut album, Madstock..., Tim DiGravina of AllMusic described "Strawberry Fields Forever" as an "extremely successful" reworking of the Beatles' original, and admires it as one of the tracks that convey "the joys of perfect, happy places that simply can't exist".

=== Charts ===
==== Weekly charts ====
| Chart (1990) | Peak position |
|---|---|
| Australian ARIA Report | 29 |
| Belgian Ultratop 50 Singles (Flanders) | 47 |
| European Eurochart Hot 100 | 7 |
| Finnish Suomen virallinen lista | 17 |
| Irish Singles Chart | 7 |
| Israeli Singles Chart | 1 |
| Luxembourgian Radio Luxembourg | 2 |
| New Zealand RIANZ Singles Chart | 20 |
| UK Singles Chart | 3 |
| US Modern Rock Tracks | 11 |

==== Year-end charts ====
| Chart (1990) | Position |
|---|---|
| UK Club Chart | 74 |

== Other artists ==
"Strawberry Fields Forever" has been recorded by many other artists. Tomorrow, a band that, along with Pink Floyd and Soft Machine, spearheaded London's psychedelic scene, drew heavily from the Beatles' work in their February 1968 release Tomorrow and included a cover of the song on that album. The self-titled debut album by American rock band Vanilla Fudge, released in August 1967, contained a brief homage to "Strawberry Fields Forever" at the end of their cover of "Eleanor Rigby". (The homage is entitled "ELDS" on CD versions of the album, and CD versions of the album in fact additionally spell out an acrostic of the song as an homage, with portions of preceding tracks entitled "STRA", "WBER" and "RYFI".) In August 1969, Richie Havens performed "Strawberry Fields Forever" as part of his set to open the Woodstock Festival.

In 1976, a version by Todd Rundgren was released on his album Faithful, and Peter Gabriel covered the track in the musical documentary All This and World War II. Highlighting the line "Living is easy with eyes closed", Gabriel's recording accompanies newsreel footage of British prime minister Neville Chamberlain's "Peace for our time" declaration after his meeting with Adolf Hitler in Munich in 1938. A recording by Ben Harper was used in the 2001 film I Am Sam, and Jim Sturgess and Joe Anderson covered the track for the 2007 film Across the Universe. Los Fabulosos Cadillacs recorded a ska version of the song featuring Debbie Harry for their 1995 album Rey Azúcar, which was a hit in Latin America.

The song has also been covered by the Bee Gees, the Bobs, Eugene Chadbourne, Sandy Farina, Laurence Juber, David Lanz, Cyndi Lauper, Me First and the Gimme Gimmes, Mother's Finest, Odetta, Andy Partridge, the Shadows, Plastic Penny, the Ventures and Cassandra Wilson. The vocal melody for "Strawberry Fields Forever" provided the piano score of experimental classical composer Alvin Lucier's 1990 composition "Nothing Is Real".

== Sources ==
- Austerlitz, Saul (2007). Money for Nothing: A History of the Music Video from the Beatles to the White Stripes. New York, NY: Continuum. ISBN 978-0-8264-1818-0.
- Babiuk, Andy (2002). Beatles Gear: All the Fab Four's Instruments, from Stage to Studio. Milwaukee, WI: Backbeat Books. ISBN 0-87930-731-5.
- Badman, Keith (2001). The Beatles Diary Volume 2: After the Break-Up 1970–2001. London: Omnibus Press. ISBN 978-0-7119-8307-6.
- The Beatles (2000). The Beatles Anthology. San Francisco, CA: Chronicle Books. ISBN 0-8118-2684-8.
- Brend, Mark (2005). Strange Sounds: Offbeat Instruments and Sonic Experiments in Pop. San Francisco, CA: Backbeat Books. ISBN 978-0-879308551.
- Brode, Douglas; Brode, Shea T., eds. (2015). Gene Roddenberry's Star Trek: The Original Cast Adventures. Lanham, MD: Rowman & Littlefield. ISBN 978-1-4422-4987-5.
- Burns, Gary (2000). "Refab Four: Beatles for Sale in the Age of Music Video". In Inglis, Ian (ed.). The Beatles, Popular Music and Society: A Thousand Voices. Basingstoke, UK: Macmillan Press. ISBN 978-0-333-76156-4.
- Carr, Roy; Tyler, Tony (1978). The Beatles: An Illustrated Record. London: Trewin Copplestone Publishing. ISBN 0-450-04170-0.
- Castleman, Harry; Podrazik, Walter J. (1976). All Together Now: The First Complete Beatles Discography 1961–1975. New York, NY: Ballantine Books. ISBN 0-345-25680-8.
- Compton, Todd (2017). Who Wrote the Beatle Songs? A History of Lennon-McCartney. San Jose: Pahreah Press. ISBN 978-0-9988997-0-1.
- Courrier, Kevin (2009). Artificial Paradise: The Dark Side of the Beatles' Utopian Dream. Westport, CT: Praeger. ISBN 978-0-313-34586-9.
- Cunningham, Mark (1998). Good Vibrations: A History of Record Production. London: Sanctuary. ISBN 978-1-860742422.
- DeRogatis, Jim (2003). Turn on Your Mind: Four Decades of Great Psychedelic Rock. Milwaukee, WI: Hal Leonard. ISBN 978-0-634-05548-5.
- Doggett, Peter (2015). Electric Shock: From the Gramophone to the iPhone – 125 Years of Pop Music. London: The Bodley Head. ISBN 978-1-84792-218-2.
- Everett, Walter (1999). The Beatles as Musicians: Revolver Through the Anthology. New York, NY: Oxford University Press. ISBN 0-19-512941-5.
- Everett, Walter (2009). The Foundations of Rock: From "Blue Suede Shoes" to "Suite: Judy Blue Eyes". New York, NY: Oxford University Press. ISBN 978-0-19-531024-5.
- Frontani, Michael R. (2007). The Beatles: Image and the Media. Jackson, MS: University Press of Mississippi. ISBN 978-1-57806-965-1.
- Gaines, Steven (1995) [1986]. Heroes & Villains: The True Story of the Beach Boys. Boston, MA: Da Capo Press. ISBN 978-0-306-80647-6.
- Gendron, Bernard (2002). Between Montmartre and the Mudd Club: Popular Music and the Avant-Garde. Chicago, IL: University of Chicago Press. ISBN 978-0-226-28737-9.
- Gilliland, John (1969). "Sergeant Pepper at the Summit: The very best of a very good year" (audio). Pop Chronicles. University of North Texas Libraries.
- Gould, Jonathan (2007). Can't Buy Me Love: The Beatles, Britain, and America. New York, NY: Harmony Books. ISBN 978-0-307-35337-5.
- Greene, Doyle (2016). Rock, Counterculture and the Avant-Garde, 1966–1970: How the Beatles, Frank Zappa and the Velvet Underground Defined an Era. Jefferson, NC: McFarland. ISBN 978-1-4766-6214-5.
- Guesdon, Jean-Michel; Margotin, Philippe (2013). All the Songs: The Story Behind Every Beatles Release. New York, NY: Black Dog & Leventhal. ISBN 978-1-57912-952-1.
- Howard, David N. (2004). Sonic Alchemy: Visionary Music Producers and Their Maverick Recordings. Milwaukee, WI: Hal Leonard. ISBN 978-0-634-05560-7.
- Ingham, Chris (2006). The Rough Guide to the Beatles (2nd edn). London: Rough Guides. ISBN 978-1-84353-720-5.
- Kozinn, Allan (1995). The Beatles. London: Phaidon. ISBN 0-7148-3203-0.
- Lewisohn, Mark (1992). The Complete Beatles Chronicle. New York, NY: Harmony Books. ISBN 0-600-58749-5.
- Lewisohn, Mark (2005) [1988]. The Complete Beatles Recording Sessions: The Official Story of the Abbey Road Years 1962–1970. London: Bounty Books. ISBN 978-0-7537-2545-0.
- MacDonald, Ian (2005). Revolution in the Head: The Beatles' Records and the Sixties (2nd rev. edn). Chicago, IL: Chicago Review Press. ISBN 978-1-55652-733-3.
- Miles, Barry (1997). Paul McCartney: Many Years From Now. New York, NY: Henry Holt & Company. ISBN 0-8050-5249-6.
- Miles, Barry (2001). The Beatles Diary Volume 1: The Beatles Years. London: Omnibus Press. ISBN 0-7119-8308-9.
- Pedler, Dominic (2003). The Songwriting Secrets of the Beatles. London: Omnibus Press. ISBN 978-0-7119-8167-6.
- Philo, Simon (2015). British Invasion: The Crosscurrents of Musical Influence. Lanham, MD: Rowman & Littlefield. ISBN 978-0-8108-8626-1.
- Prendergast, Mark (2003). The Ambient Century: From Mahler to Moby – The Evolution of Sound in the Electronic Age. New York, NY: Bloomsbury. ISBN 1-58234-323-3.
- Riley, Tim (2011). Lennon: The Man, the Myth, the Music – The Definitive Life. London: Random House. ISBN 978-0-7535-4020-6.
- Rodriguez, Robert (2010). Fab Four FAQ 2.0: The Beatles' Solo Years, 1970–1980. Milwaukee, WI: Backbeat Books. ISBN 978-1-4165-9093-4.
- Rodriguez, Robert (2012). Revolver: How the Beatles Reimagined Rock 'n' Roll. Milwaukee, WI: Backbeat Books. ISBN 978-1-61713-009-0.
- Schaffner, Nicholas (1978). The Beatles Forever. New York, NY: McGraw-Hill. ISBN 0-07-055087-5.
- Sheff, David (2000) [1981]. All We Are Saying: The Last Major Interview with John Lennon and Yoko Ono. New York, NY: St. Martin's Press. ISBN 0-312-25464-4.
- Simonelli, David (2013). Working Class Heroes: Rock Music and British Society in the 1960s and 1970s. Lanham, MD: Lexington Books. ISBN 978-0-7391-7051-9.
- Spitz, Bob (2005). The Beatles: The Biography. New York, NY: Little, Brown and Company. ISBN 1-84513-160-6.
- Sullivan, Steve (2017). Encyclopedia of Great Popular Song Recordings, Volumes 3 & 4. Lanham, MD: Rowman & Littlefield. ISBN 978-1-4422-5448-0.
- Turner, Steve (1999). A Hard Day's Write: The Stories Behind Every Beatles Song (2nd edn). New York, NY: Carlton/HarperCollins. ISBN 0-06-273698-1.
- Turner, Steve (2016). Beatles '66: The Revolutionary Year. New York, NY: HarperLuxe. ISBN 978-0-06-249713-0.
- Unterberger, Richie (2006). The Unreleased Beatles: Music & Film. San Francisco, CA: Backbeat Books. ISBN 978-0-87930-892-6.
- Winn, John C. (2009). That Magic Feeling: The Beatles' Recorded Legacy, Volume Two, 1966–1970. New York, NY: Three Rivers Press. ISBN 978-0-307-45239-9.
- Womack, Kenneth (2014). The Beatles Encyclopedia: Everything Fab Four. Santa Barbara, CA: ABC-CLIO. ISBN 978-0-313-39171-2.
