= Swarmandal =

Indian box zither

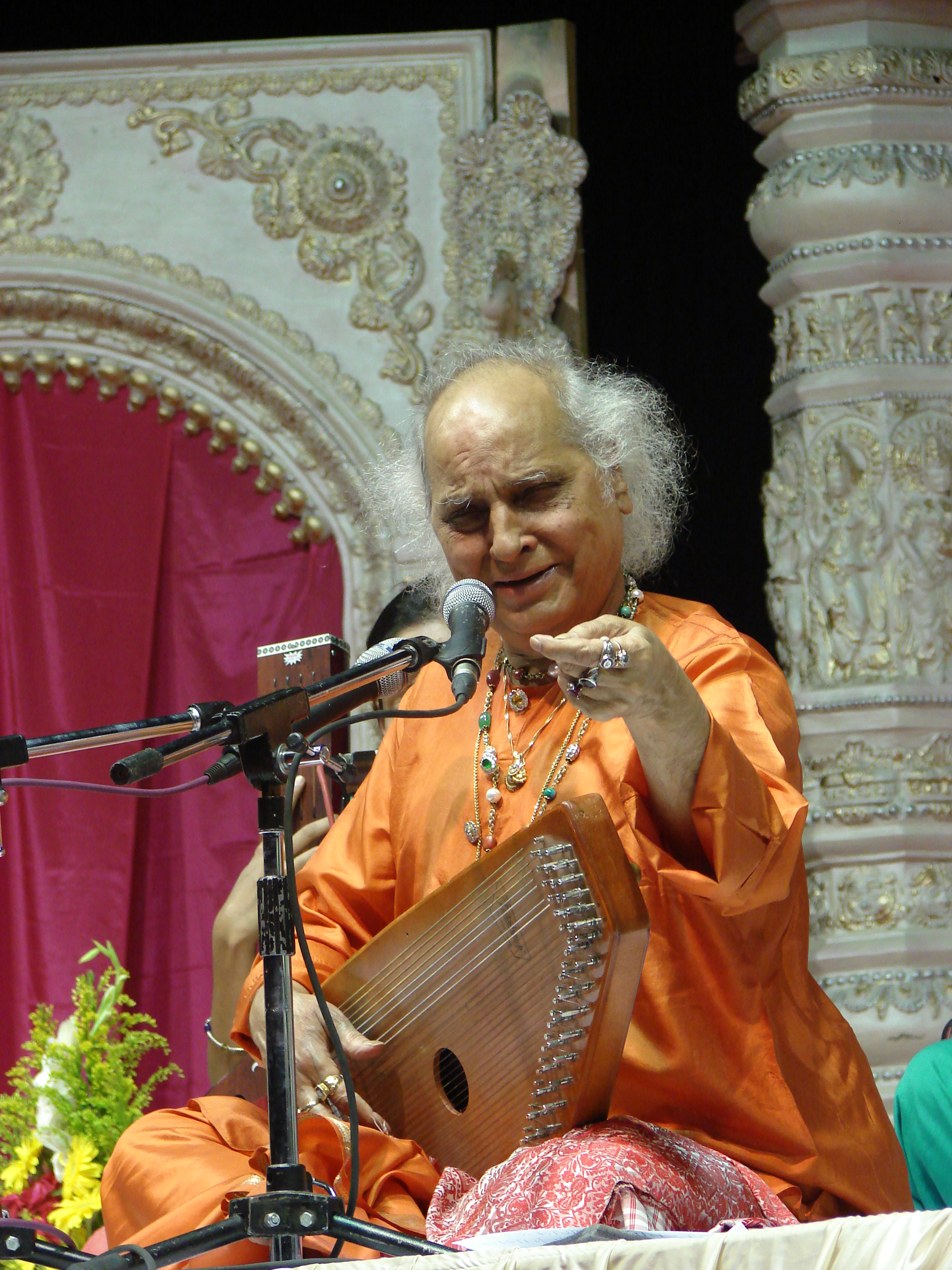
- Pundit Jasraj with a swarmandal

String instrument
- Other names: Surmandal
- Classification: (Chordophone), String instrument
- Hornbostel–Sachs classification: 314.122-5,6 (Resonated box zither, plucked by fingers or a plectrum)
- Developed: Probably imported with conquerors or traders in medieval period and adapted to suit Indian culture. May have roots in a native instrument called the mattakokilā.

Related instruments
- autoharp; board zither; box zither; psaltery; qanun

The swarmandal (Hindi: स्वरमण्डल [s̪ʋərməɳɖəl̪]), surmandal, or Indian harp is a plucked box zither, originating from India, similar to the qanun that is today most commonly used as an accompanying instrument for vocal Indian classical music. It is part of the culture of Northern India and is used in concerts to accompany vocal music. The name combines Sanskrit words svara (notes) and maṇḍala (circle), representing its ability to produce many notes. The instrument was seen as equivalent by the Ā'īn-i-akbarī to the qanun.

== Construction ==
Modern swarmandals are similar to European psaltries. Autoharps are used as an equivalent instrument in India today, especially with the chord-button mechanism taken out. Modern swarmandals are trapezoidal and measure 51 cm (20 in) in length and 28 cm (11 in) width. Instruments may have as many as 40 strings, while older instruments from the 19th century were recorded as having 21 strings. The strings are hooked in a nail lodged in the right edge of the swarmandal and on the left are wound around tuning pegs which can be tightened with a special key. Wooden pegs were used instead of metal ones in the medieval period. A sharp 1/2-inch (13 mm) ridge on both sides of the swarmandal stands a little apart from the nails on which the strings are tightened. This ridge functions as a bridge on both sides. The swarmandal is similar to the autoharp or zither in many respects.

== History ==
The swarmandal may be the same as the 13th-century instrument known as the mattakokilā (intoxicated cuckoo). In the Mughal period, the swarmandal was seen as equivalent by the Ā'īn-i-akbarī to the qanun. In the 19th century, a writer commented that good performances on the instrument were rare, because it was difficult to play and, at the time, expensive to buy.

== In popular culture ==
Several modern artists have performed with the instrument. Some of the vocalists who have used it extensively are Bade Ghulam Ali Khan, Salamat Ali Khan, Jasraj, Rajan Sajan Mishra, Kishori Amonkar, Rashid Khan, and Ajoy Chakrabarty. After travelling to India in late 1966, George Harrison introduced the swarmandal into the Beatles' sound on their 1967 single "Strawberry Fields Forever". He also played it on his Indian classical-style composition "Within You Without You", from the band's Sgt. Pepper's Lonely Hearts Club Band album.

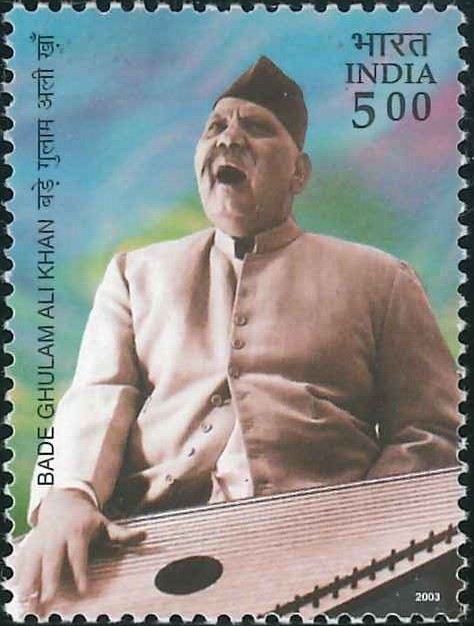
Bade Ghulam Ali Khan featured on an Indian stamp with the swarmandal

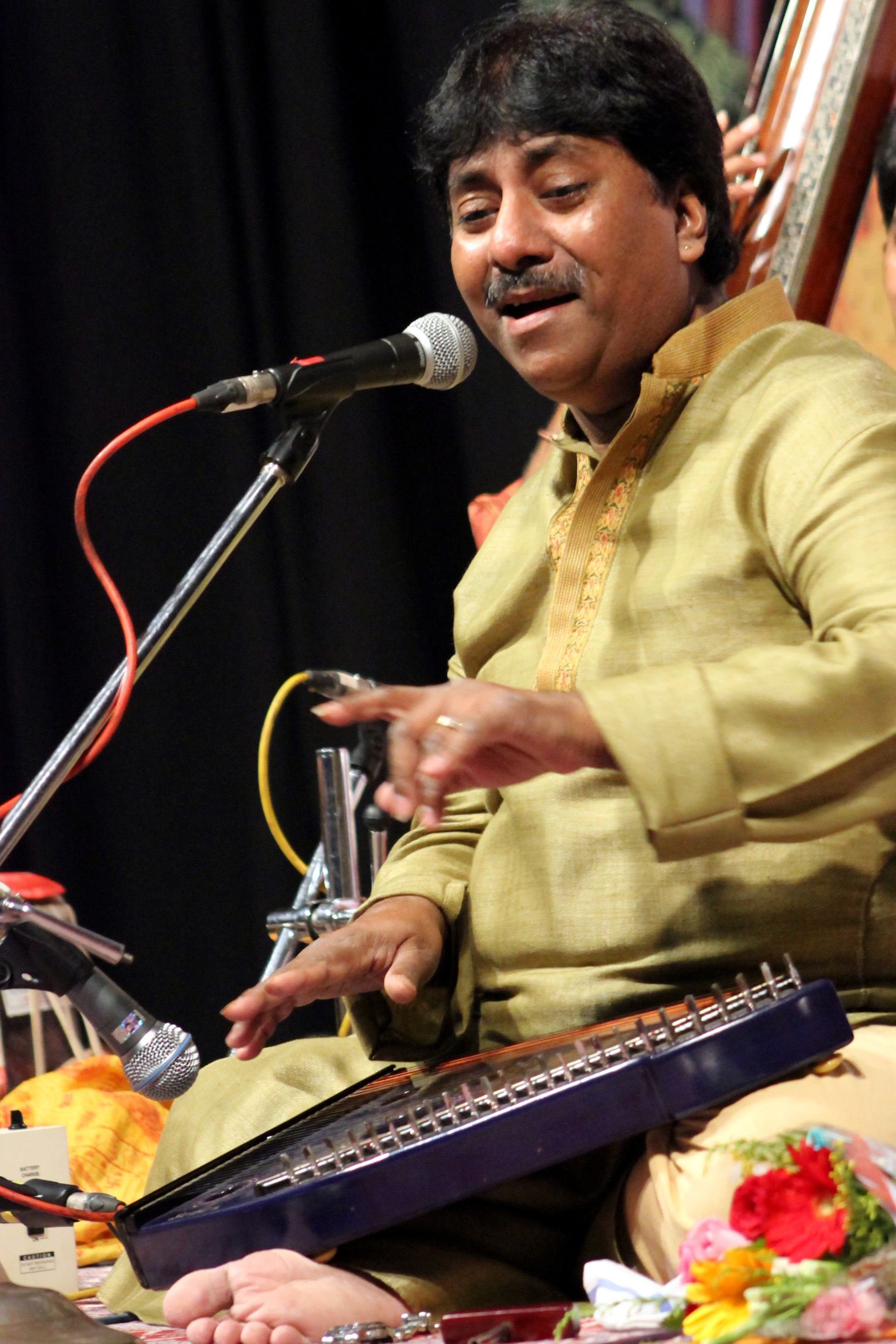
Rashid Khan playing swarmandal

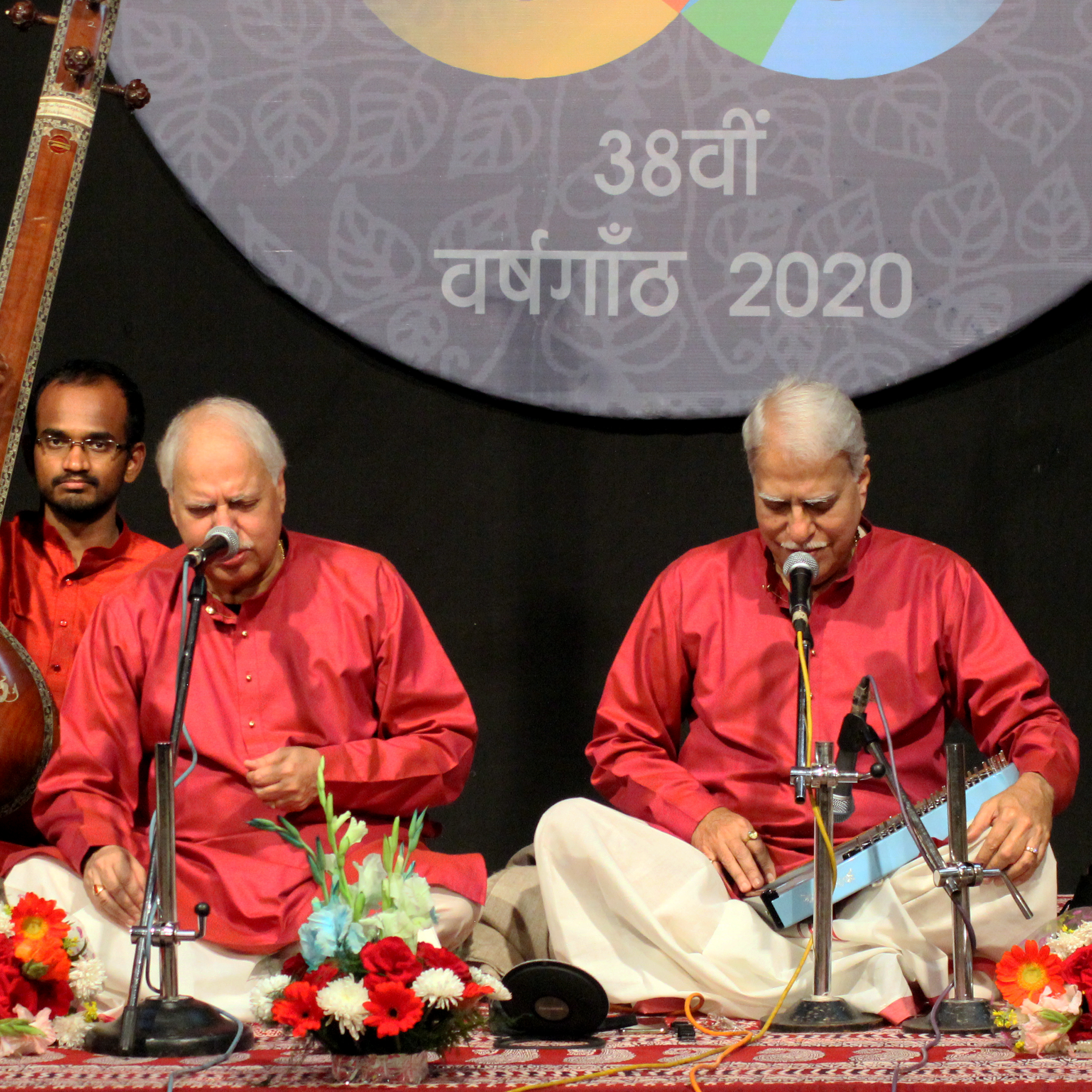
Pandit Rajan Mishra singing with swarmandal

== See also ==
- Drone (music)
- Hindustani classical music
- Zither
