= Knole Park =

Park in Sevenoaks, United Kingdom

Coordinates: 51.262°N 0.210°E

- Site of Special Scientific Interest
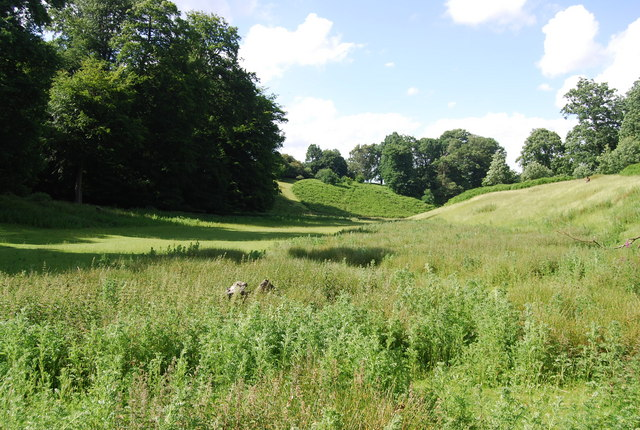
- Location of Knole Park.
- Area of search: Kent
- Grid reference: TQ 543 538
- Interest: Biological
- Area: 383.4 hectares (947 acres)
- Notification date: 1991
- Location map: Magic Map

Knole Park is a 383.4-hectare (947-acre) biological Site of Special Scientific Interest in Sevenoaks in Kent. About 43 acres of the park belongs to the National Trust, as does Knole House, which sits within it. The remaining parkland is privately owned by the Knole Estate. It is in the Kent Downs Area of Outstanding Natural Beauty.

The park has acidic woodland, parkland, woods and ponds. It has the best ancient woodland invertebrates in the county, including the nationally rare beetle Platypus cylindrus and several nationally scarce species, and it also has a rich fungus flora.

The park is open to the public and has a herd of around 350 deer, both fallow deer and Sika deer, which are owned and managed by the Knole Estate.

The golf course of Knole Park Golf Club is located within Knole Park.

== In popular culture ==
The park was the filming location for the Beatles' "Strawberry Fields Forever" promotional music video. It was also used for location filming in the romantic drama film Wuthering Heights (2026).
