= Madstock... =

Studio album by Candy Flip
- Released: 27 March 1990
- Genres: Electronic, Madchester, acid house
- Labels: Debut, Atlantic
- Producer: Candy Flip

Singles from Madstock...
- 1. "Love Is Life" Released: 1989; 2. "Strawberry Fields Forever" Released: 1990; 3. "This Can Be Real" Released: 1990; 4. "Space" Released: 1990; 5. "Redhills Road" Released: 1990

Professional ratings
Review scores
| Source | Rating |
|---|---|
| AllMusic | 4/5 stars |
| NME | 7/10 |
| Q magazine | 3/5 stars |

Madstock...The Continuing Adventures of Bubblecar Fish is the first and only album of English acid house band Candy Flip. Four of its singles charted on the UK Singles Chart, with the biggest hit, "Strawberry Fields Forever", a cover of the Beatles song, peaking at No. 3 in March 1990. Lloyd Bradley from Q magazine described the album as having "satisfying solid beats and oozing melodies".

== Track listing ==
1. "Love Is Life" - 5:09
2. "Strawberry Fields Forever" - 4:10
3. "Wonderland" - 4:59
4. "This Can Be Real" - 5:21
5. "Madstock" - 5:55
6. "Redhills Road" - 4:30
7. "See the Light" - 4:52
8. "Theme" - 5:37
9. "Space" - 4:29
10. "Ask Why" - 4:16
11. "Strawberry Fields Forever" (Bonus Track) - 5:54
12. "Space" (Funny Mix) - 4:33
