= The Lilac Time (album) =

Studio album by the Lilac Time
- Released: 2 November 1987
- Recorded: August 1986 – August 1987
- Studios: Highbury Studio, Kings Heath, Birmingham
- Genres: Pop rock; jangle pop; folk-pop
- Length: 37:34
- Labels: Swordfish; Fontana; Mercury
- Producers: The Lilac Time; Bob Lamb

The Lilac Time chronology
The Lilac Time (1987)	Paradise Circus (1989)

Singles from The Lilac Time
- 1. "Return to Yesterday" Released: November 1987; 2. "You've Got to Love" Released: October 1988; 3. "Black Velvet" Released: November 1988

The Lilac Time is the debut album by English band the Lilac Time and was released in 1987 by Swordfish Records. The album was partially remixed and re-released by Fontana Records in 1988.

== Background and recording ==
In early 1987, singer-songwriter Stephen Duffy, who had previously established a career under both his own name and the moniker Tin Tin, was dropped by Virgin subsidiary 10 Records. Duffy's first solo album for the label, The Ups and Downs, had reached number 35 on the UK Album Charts and had included the hits "Kiss Me" and "Icing on the Cake", which reached numbers 4 and 14 respectively on the UK Singles Chart. Duffy's second solo album, Because We Love You, had been a commercial disappointment and his third, Designer Beatnik, recorded with Roger Freeman and Françoise Gigandet and released under the moniker Dr. Calculus, had been an experimental sound collage with little commercial potential. Duffy had already begun recording his fourth album for the label when he was dropped; he envisaged a folk-flavoured release, but this proposed new direction was met with disapproval from the record company, which played a part in his being let go. (Note: According to Duffy, 10 Records wanted him to find a female singer and record a dance music album.)

For this new album, Duffy was joined by his multi-instrumentalist brother Nick and his girlfriend's best friend Michael Weston on keyboards. Christening themselves the Lilac Time (a name taken from the lyrics of Nick Drake's song "River Man"), the band began recording at producer Bob Lamb's Highbury Studio in Kings Heath, south Birmingham on 26 August 1986. They recorded five tracks, of which "Rockland", "And the Ship Sails On", and "Return to Yesterday" ended up on the album, while "Reunion Ball" and "Rain on a River" were held over for B-sides on the album's singles.

In summer 1987, the band relocated to Searles Cottage, an old dairy in the village of Mathon in the Malvern Hills, to rehearse and record demos of new material. (Note: Searles Cottage is pictured on the album's front cover.) Duffy used what remained of the money he had received as royalties from his hit single "Kiss Me" to complete the album, with sessions finishing at Lamb's in late summer 1987. In August or September, Duffy telephoned Swordfish Records in Birmingham, a record shop and label, and asked them if they were interested in releasing the album and if they could get it out before Christmas 1987. The record company agreed and 2000 vinyl LPs were pressed up along with 1000 CDs.

== Music ==
The songs that Duffy and the band recorded for the album blended pop music and folk instrumentation. The delicate and folky album opener, "Black Velvet", finds Duffy singing of an ocean falling to its knees, calling to a lover without words, and spending the night crawling "like a snail on black velvet." The song was issued as the third single to be taken from the album and has been described by critic Tim DiGravina as, "brimming with wonderful imagery and full of subtle tones".

The uptempo song "Return to Yesterday", which was the lead single from the album, has lyrics that reminisce about England's past, while wondering about its future. In 2018, Duffy called the song, "a bit of a mission statement" and a recording that "tells you all you need to know about the band". DiGravina noted the song's rolling banjos and political and sociological lyrics, while also describing it as, "evocative of a vintage 1800s steam train roaring through green pastures and lush vineyards".

DiGravina has also remarked on the aggressive political stance of the lyrics of "Rockland", the "easygoing and carefree melodies" of "You've Got to Love", the "light orchestral Pop flourishes" heard in "Too Sooner Late than Better", and the fact that the instrumental "Trumpets from Montparnasse" doesn't feature any trumpets. DiGravina also described the songs "And the Ship Sails On" and "Love Becomes a Savage" as being "dark and moody", concluding that, "so much of the Lilac Time's debut album is concerned with the passing or the passage of time."

== Release ==
The Lilac Time was released by Swordfish Records on 2 November 1987, but it didn't reach the UK Albums Chart. The first single taken from the album was "Return to Yesterday", which was also released by Swordfish in November 1987, but this too failed to chart.

The Lilac Time were subsequently signed to Fontana Records, who re-released the album on CD, LP and cassette on 20 June 1988, with four of its tracks remixed. A remixed version of "Return to Yesterday" was re-released by Fontana in July 1988 and this time it reached number 82 on the UK Singles Chart. Two more singles were taken from the album, with "You've Got to Love" appearing in October 1988 and reaching number 79 in the UK charts, and "Black Velvet" being issued in November 1988 and reaching number 99.

The album was issued in the U.S. by Mercury Records in 1988, with a re-arranged track listing and the songs "Gone For a Burton" and "Railway Bazaar" added as bonus tracks on the CD. It also underwent further remixes and changes for its Mercury release, with the album version of "Black Velvet" being replaced by the single remix and Duffy adding additional backing vocals and new bass parts to some songs.

In 2005, the song "Trumpets from Montparnasse" was used in a Flora margarine television advertisement in the UK, and it also appeared the following year in the BBC Three documentary series, Honey, We're Killing the Kids. As a result, Duffy would later call it the band's "most heard song". The song's author, Nick Duffy, told The Times newspaper in April 2006 that the Flora advert had so far earned him £37,000, adding, "I celebrated by buying two pairs of shoes from the same shop, on the same day."

The Lilac Time was reissued in an expanded and remastered edition by Fontana in 2006, with the addition of nine bonus tracks, including five previously unreleased BBC Radio 1 recordings first broadcast in 1988.

== Reception ==
Professional ratings
Review scores
Source	Rating
AllMusic	4.5/5 stars
Trouser Press	favourable

Contemporary reviews for the album were almost universally positive, with Time Out magazine making note of the album's "melody choruses that charm and stick like sweet glue", while describing its contents as, "sensitive" and "witty". In the 20 February 1988 edition of Melody Maker, John Wilde called the album "quietly delightful" and singled out the songs "Return to Yesterday" and "You've Got to Love" as highlights, describing them as "internally combustible" and "ravishing" respectively.

A later review by Tim DiGravina for the AllMusic website described the album as "a fascinating debut", "a minimasterpiece", and "the start of a perfect career". DiGravina also commented, "Right off the bat, Stephen Duffy and company mix poetry, pop melodies, and folk instrumentation to create songs of endless charm, mesmerizing passion, and tantalizing atmosphere." Trouser Press described the album as "unfailingly delightful" and an "unprepossessing gem", while making note of its "jaunty love songs, small-town contemplations and skeptical bits of philosophy brought to life with simple delicacy...".

In 2024, The Independent ranked The Lilac Time as 13th on their list of 20 most underrated albums.

== Track listing ==
Track listing is for the original 1987 Swordfish Records' release; the 1988 Fontana Records re-release places "Return to Yesterday" and "Rockland" in reverse order.

All songs written and arranged by the Lilac Time.

=== Side one ===
1. "Black Velvet" – 3:21
2. "Rockland" – 4:06
3. "Return to Yesterday" – 3:43
4. "You've Got to Love" – 4:36
5. "Love Becomes a Savage" – 3:50

=== Side two ===
1. "Together" – 2:53
2. "The Road to Happiness" – 3:59
3. "Too Sooner Late than Better" – 3:39
4. "And the Ship Sails On" – 3:01
5. "Trumpets from Montparnasse" – 3:45

=== U.S. Mercury CD bonus tracks ===
11. "Gone For a Burton" – 3:43
12. "Railway Bazaar" – 3:56

=== 2006 remastered CD bonus tracks ===
11. "Black Velvet" (Remix) – 3:25
12. "Reunion Ball" – 3:35
13. "Gone For a Burton" – 3:43
14. "Streetcorner" – 4:10
15. "The King and Queen of Carioca" (BBC Session) – 4:50
16. "Take Time" (BBC Session) – 3:16
17. "Hargeesha" (BBC Session) – 2:51
18. "Return to Yesterday" (BBC Session) – 3:34
19. "You've Got to Love" (BBC Session) – 4:14

== Personnel ==
- Stephen Duffy - acoustic guitar, electric guitar, bass guitar, vocals
- Nick Duffy - banjo, accordion, violin
- Michael Weston - keyboards
