= & Love for All =

Studio album by the Lilac Time
- Released: 17 September 1990
- Recorded: 1989 – 1990
- Studio: Rockfield Studios
- Genres: Pop rock; alternative pop; indie pop
- Length: 42:38
- Labels: Fontana; PolyGram
- Producers: Andy Partridge; John Leckie; Stephen Duffy

The Lilac Time chronology
Paradise Circus (1989)	& Love for All (1990)	Astronauts (1991)

Singles from & Love for All
- 1. "All for Love & Love for All" Released: April 1990; 2. "It'll End in Tears" Released: July 1990; 3. "The Laundry" Released: October 1990

& Love for All is the third album by English band the Lilac Time and was released by Fontana Records in 1990. It saw the band move away from the folk pop sound of their first two albums towards an electric guitar and keyboard heavy sound indebted to 60's pop and psychedelia.

== Recording ==
As a result of delays to the release of the Lilac Time's second album Paradise Circus, the band had already begun working on & Love for All before that album was released in October 1989. Sessions for the album began at Rockfield Studios in Monmouthshire, Wales, with Andy Partridge of XTC and the Dukes of Stratosphear producing. Partridge left the project mid-way through recording and was replaced by John Leckie, who recorded a further six tracks with the band. The band's lead singer and songwriter Stephen Duffy has said that the tracks recorded with Leckie were more representative of the band's sound than those produced by Partridge and came "closest to sounding like us".

The album was mixed at RAK and Livingston Recording Studios by Leckie. Shortly after the album's release in September 1990, the Lilac Time were dropped by their record label Fontana. Creation Records boss Alan McGee became the group's new manager at around this time and they subsequently signed to Creation.

== Music ==
The music that the Lilac Time recorded for & Love for All featured a greater reliance on electric guitars and keyboards than the band's formerly acoustic sound. Critic Stewart Mason has likened the overall sound of the album to producers Partridge and Leckie's collaboration on the Dukes of Stratosphear records, while Tim DiGravina hears the influence of Woody Guthrie, Nick Drake and the Smiths in some songs.

The album opens with "Fields", which critic DiGravina has described as "catchy and endlessly effervescent". "Fields" is also heard later on in the album in "reprise" and "acoustic reprise" versions.

Mason remarked upon the strong Magical Mystery Tour era Beatles influence in the album's second song and lead single "All for Love and Love for All" (which also name checks the pre-Beatles band the Quarrymen in its first verse). Mason described "All for Love and Love for All" as a "glorious pop nugget" with "an immensely catchy chorus".

DiGravina has also commented in the Woody Guthrie-influenced "Let Our Land Be the One", which he describes as being a song that combines world-weariness and a political call to action with a humanitarian message. He also called "Trinity" a stark and somber piece of music that feels like Duffy's answer to Nick Drake's song "Pink Moon".

DiGravina describes "And on We Go" as "breezy and sorrow-filled", and has interpreted Duffy's lyrics as being concerned with the realisation that life simply goes on in one grand tableau, regardless what course one chooses. This is something that he feels Duffy is both perplexed about and ultimately indifferent to.

== Release and reception ==
Professional ratings
Review scores
Source	Rating
AllMusic	4.5/5 stars
Trouser Press	mixed

& Love for All was released on 17 September 1990 by Fontana Records, but it did not reach the UK Albums Chart. Initial copies of the LP release came with a free "Greatest Hits" bonus record which featured a selection of songs from the band's previous two albums.

The lead single from & Love for All was the similarly named, "All for Love & Love for All", which was issued in April 1990 and reached number 77 on the UK Singles Chart. Two further singles were taken from the album: "It'll End in Tears" (July 1990) and "The Laundry" (October 1990), but neither release charted.

The album received generally positive reviews upon its release, with Time Out calling it a "sublime slice of perfect pop from Stephen Duffy once more proving that he's the wildest pop talent in the west." Melody Maker were also enthusiastic about the album, describing its contents as "Hippyish pop songs so subtle and effective they could have been written by Burt Bacharach." In a more recent review for the AllMusic website, Stewart Mason gave & Love for All 4 1/2 stars out of 5 and called it "the first genuinely excellent album of Stephen Duffy's career". However, Trouser Press had a more mixed opinion of the album, remarking that the combination of Partridge's art-rock arranging style and Duffy's simple tunes was "an iffy proposition" that "leaves the less dynamic performances sounding flat."

& Love for All was reissued in an expanded and remastered edition by Fontana in 2006, with the addition of eight bonus tracks, including four previously unreleased BBC Radio 1 recordings first broadcast in 1990.

== Track listing ==
All songs written by Stephen Duffy, except track 10: written by Nick Duffy.

=== Side one ===
1. "Fields" – 4:13
2. "Fields" (Reprise) – 1:08
3. "All for Love & Love for All" – 3:24
4. "Let Our Land Be the One" – 3:09
5. "I Went to the Dance" – 3:58
6. "Wait and See" – 3:58
7. "Honest to God" – 1:25

=== Side two ===
1. "The Laundry" – 3:34
2. "Paper Boat" – 2:55
3. "Skabaskablio" – 1:30
4. "It'll End in Tears (I Won't Cry)" – 4:24
5. "Trinity" – 2:59
6. "And on We Go" – 5:04
7. "Fields" (Acoustic Reprise) – 0:57

=== 2006 remastered CD bonus tracks ===
15. "Julie Written on the Fence" – 4:28
16. "Only Passing Through" – 2:47
17. "Bed of Roses" – 3:14
18. "Cover" – 5:51
19. "Fields" (BBC Session) – 5:57
20. "Paper Boat" (BBC Session) – 2:56
21. "All for Love & Love for All" (BBC Session) – 4:14
22. "And on We Go" (BBC Session) – 4:50

== Personnel ==
The Lilac Time

- Stephen Duffy - acoustic guitar, electric guitar, vocals
- Nick Duffy - banjo, acoustic guitar, accordion, piano
- Michael Giri - drums, backing vocals
- Mickey Harris - bass guitar, backing vocals

Additional personnel

- Cara Tivey - piano
- Andy Partridge - lead guitar
- Stuart Gordon - violin
- Charles Dickie - cello
- Cathy Stevens - viola
