= Designer Beatnik =

Studio album by Dr Calculus
- Released: 4 August 1986
- Recorded: 1984–1986
- Genres: Experimental; dance; rock; funk; house; electro
- Length: 41:05
- Label: 10
- Producers: Stephen Duffy; Roger Freeman; Paul Staveley O'Duffy

Singles from Designer Beatnik
- 1. "Programme 7" Released: January 1985; 2. "Perfume from Spain" Released: 21 June 1986

Designer Beatnik is the only album by English electronic act Dr Calculus, a duo of Stephen Duffy and former Pigbag trombonist Roger Freeman. Released in August 1986 through 10 Records, it was produced by Duffy and Freeman with Paul Staveley O'Duffy. Dr Calculus were inspired by the emergent ecstasy culture in London and, in January 1985, released the single "Programme 7", leading to the record's production.

Inspired by 'cut-and-paste' music and fashion, Designer Beatnik is considered a work of funk, rock and experimental music that mixes dance rhythms, rap, found noises, brass and horns, prominent beats, and spoken dialogue and voiceovers. Largely instrumental, the record largely avoids vocal melodies, with nonsensical lyrics being recited by friends of Duffy and Freeman. Aiming to achieve a French New Wave-inspired sound, the duo used the cut-up technique to collage texts from numerous writers. Several of Freeman's former Pigbag bandmates contribute to the recording.

In June 1986, the album was preceded by the single "Perfume from Spain", which mixes numerous genres with Sleng Teng rhythms. Neither the single nor Designer Beatnik itself charted in the United Kingdom, with the album receiving a polarised critical reception. Following its release, Duffy returned to more conventional music. Designer Beatnik has since been discussed as a precursor of acid house and ambient house.

== Background ==
Stephen Duffy and trombonist Roger Freeman originally knew each other when they both lived in Birmingham, but by 1984 they had reacquainted in London. By this point, Duffy had recently launched a solo career for 10 Records, a subsidiary of Virgin Records, whereas Freeman had left the group Pigbag, having tired of playing their hit single "Papa's Got a Brand New Pigbag" (1981). In a later interview with Anthony Reynolds, Duffy said that Freeman had been frequenting a nightclub that played "this crazy electronic music" where all the clubbers were taking drugs, believing this to be the start of ecstasy culture in London. "I went along to some of these clubs with him, then one morning after we sat down and said, 'Okay, let'’s do something about this.'" Freeman had been working on a riff that he wanted Duffy to produce, which became "Programme 7" and the beginning of Dr Calculus.

"Programme 7" was one of several concurrent projects from Duffy, who said the track was created "really quickly and drunkenly, not really expecting it to be a record." According to Freeman, it was recorded between sessions for Duffy's album The Ups and Downs (1985), which took place on a narrowboat studio belonging to Richard Branson. Following this, Duffy secured Dr Calculus a record deal with 10 Records, which according to Virgin's managing director Simon Parker was not incongruous, given Virgin's history with "outré" acts like Mike Oldfield and Henry Cow. A well-received dance single, "Programme 7" combined obscure French references with uplifting trombone work and modern production that used editing techniques in a manner comparable to Art of Noise. Howard Marks of Music & Media commented: "If this single doesn't chart, then there is no justice in this industry of ours." Announced in December 1984 and released in early January 1985, it spent a week at number 99 on the UK Singles Chart. Duffy said the track "stopped the people who keep writing me off. I think I'll wear them down eventually by the sheer volume of work." Dr Calculus performed "Honey I'm Home", "Programme 7" and "Killed by Poetry" in a Radio 1 session for John Peel, which was broadcast on 28 January 1985.

The name 'Dr Calculus' refers to the absent-minded Professor Calculus character from Hergé's comic series The Adventures of Tintin. It is a tongue-in-cheek reference to Duffy's 'Tin Tin' alias, another character from the books. The musician considered the running theme to be his response to the name of Duran Duran, of whom he was once a member, and called it "just a joke" as he was not a fan of the series. The use of 'Dr' instead of 'Professor' came when a friend mistakenly used it when referring to the band; Freeman said it was "better because we could then add 'MDMA' after it."

== Recording ==
Produced by Duffy and Freeman with Paul Staveley O'Duffy, Designer Beatnik was recorded on a £20,000 budget from 10 Records. Freeman insisted on cutting the album before the label heard it, telling journalist Danny van Emden: "There were no clues. We didn't give them anything". According to Duffy, 10 were "a bit worried" with the project. In March 1985, it was reported that Dr Calculus had already begun working on Designer Beatnik but that it would "take a while" before completion; Duffy told interviewer Di Cross that he and Freeman "sit around and wait for the muse to hit us, we're waiting for divine inspiration! Anyway, Roger takes six weeks to do a trombone solo which still ends up sounding like an elephant receiving drugs anally." Early in the sessions, Duffy achieved a UK Top 5 hit single with "Kiss Me", an early solo song remixed by J. J. Jeczalik of Art of Noise which he promoted concurrently.

According to Freeman, the sessions were "open to all possibilities" because Dr Calculus' contract did not compromise Duffy's solo contract with Virgin, meaning Duffy felt encouraged to get 'wild' and retain various "funny mistakes, accidents, dirty words and moods" on the record, such as mispronounced words. He also recalled the musician encouraging O'Duffy to experiment with any studio effects that he previously felt he had no chance to explore. Duffy has said that ideas incorporated into the sessions include "recording the snare drum with blankets over us", and playing the mixes through headphones and then microphoning them. Some of the sessions were informed by his trip to Japan, where he experienced adoration as a pop star following the success of "Kiss Me"; he used Walkman recorders to document his experience there. Other ex-members of Pigbag appear on the record, namely trumpeter Chris Lee and baritone and tenor saxophonist Olly Moore. As producer, O'Duffy processed Chris Lee's trumpets through the '3D panner' effect, contributing to its trippy sound.

Duffy's brother Nick, who contributed violin, design and photography to the record, commented that project was a reaction to the prevalence of yuppies in the 1980s and how they were undermining the work of "the folk devils of the previous three decades"; he considered the joy in employing then-nascent music technology in the production to stem from "how things could be torn up and re-scattered in spontaneous bricolage", describing it as the reprisal of musique concrète and cut-up poetry which, for Dr Calculus, resulted in a "mélange of synthetic and found sounds, words and trombones." Freeman commented of the final album: "If Pigbag had made Sgt. Peppers it would've sounded like this and put the Beatles out of a job!"

== Composition ==
=== Musical style and themes ===
Designer Beatnik was inspired by the "cut-and-paste possibilities" of music and fashion. Considered an album of funk and rock, its music is varied, drawing on many musical styles including rap and disco, and incorporates squawking trombone from Freeman, horns, found noises, voiceovers, and excerpts of Radio 4 presenters. Emden calls it an album of "dance rhythms blown apart in all directions by apparently random snippets of television and soundtracks from Walkman recording holidays in the Far East", while according to reviewer Di Cross, it is a "musical rag bag of eccentric sounds and commentary", spliced together into electro-styled tracks with predominant beats and 'battered' brass. Reynolds refers to it as an experimental tribute to the then-nascent ecstasy culture, elaborating that it combines "cartoon dialogue, drum machines, mournful brass, funky bass and reversed strings", and noting that each track segues into the next, "forming a non-stop 40-minute piece, at times sounding like Madness – the group and the mental state – hijacking a Chicago 808 House party."

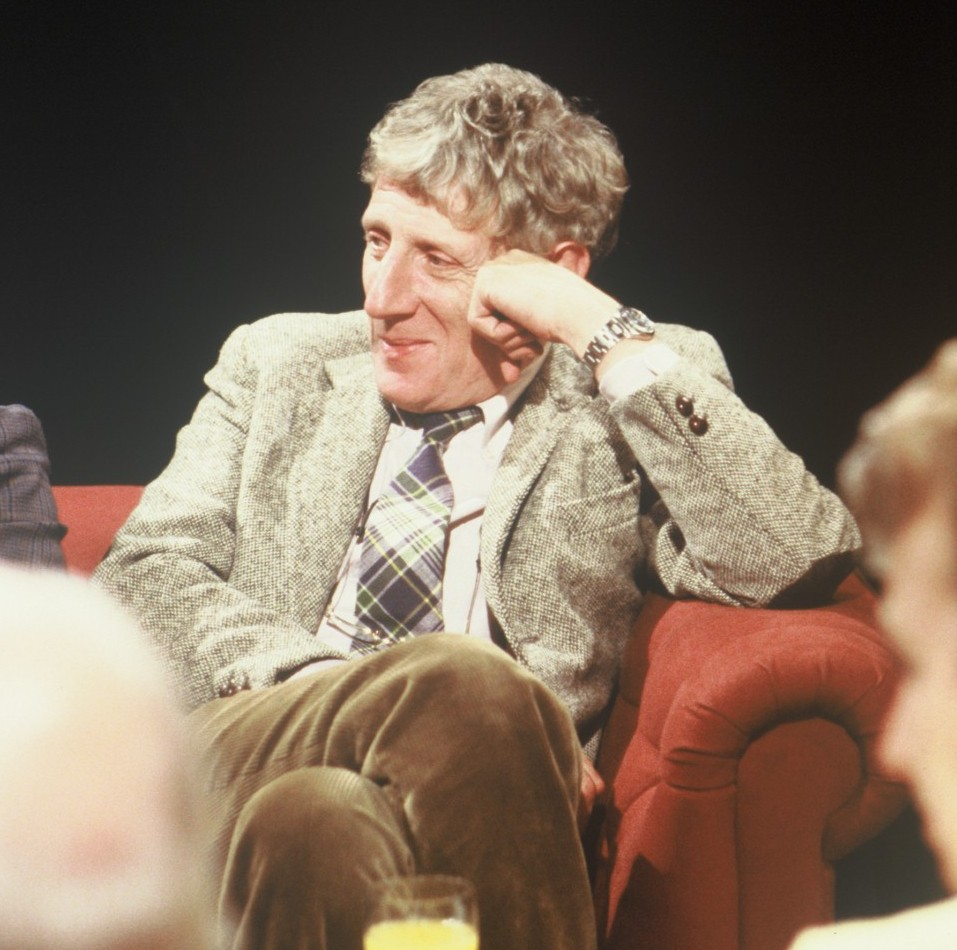
Jonathan Miller, whose film Alice in Wonderland helped inspire the album's atmosphere

Freeman described Designer Beatnik as "a sort of travelogue, like around the world in 40 minutes. It's all on there including the sound of screaming monks in the streets of Tokyo". Though dense with musical elements, the album is unique in Duffy's catalogue in that it lacks lead vocal melodies, with Duffy opting not to sing on the record. The musician commented that the minimal amount of singing that does appear largely stems from female voices, as "any melodies were always going to be on the trombone. Roger was going to come up with the riffs and I was going to do the rest." The record is largely instrumental, and underpinning it is what Reynolds calls "a queasy, dream-like atmosphere provided by the cartoon dialogue samples", a mood inspired by a VHS copy of Jonathan Miller's television play Alice in Wonderland (1966), which the duo would play in the background during recording sessions.

The lyrics have been described as nonsensical and psychedelic, and some are in French. Duffy says that their aim for the lyrics was to "create a French New Wave sound. We were quoting texts by Jacques Tati, Claude Lévi-Strauss, Shakespeare, Jean Cocteau. Quite literally. We were cutting up their actual quotes and collaging them." To this end, lyrics are recited throughout the album by some of Duffy's fashion model friends, as well as Françoise Gigandet, a friend of Freeman's who was asked to speak in her French accent. Other speech was lifted from television and radio and sound effects obtained using the Emulator sampler keyboard; according to Reynolds, the "sounds of walking on gravel, talking and laughing" likely come from Duffy's girlfriend, model Tasmin De Roemer, captured using their Walkman recorder in Japan. The couple's trip to the country also fed into "Man", which samples Japanese television.

=== Songs ===
Among the album's songs, "Moment of Being (Reprisal)" is a sedate requiem compared by Reynolds to an English summer's day at dusk. The track originated between takes when Freeman and model Caroline Dodd were conversing in front of a microphone and Duffy asked to record them. Duffy then added a reversed orchestral part from his solo song "Julie Christie", found on his album Because We Love You (1986). The title track was constructed by Freeman performing his "Westminster clock chimes impression" on the trombone over a simple drum machine beat, while Lee played a complex chord sequence on trumpet. According to Freeman, O'Duffy was left to record Lee's trumpet playing while Duffy and Freeman played pool in another room, who upon returning noticed that "everyone had a crazed look in their eyes. When it came to mixing, Paul had obviously cracked, which worked in the album's favour."

Featuring vocals from Jenny Innocent, "Perfume from Spain" explores an arty electronic style comparable to Art of Noise and incorporates Sleng Teng rhythms. Contemporary reviewers described it as a "stop-start" mix of rap, special effects and humorous lyrics, a "mish-mash" of many genres, including elements of punk and disco, and an inventive "hotch potch" track which draws on reggae, Eastern and Western musical styles. According to Duffy, the song's ecstasy-inspired lyrics were inspired by Cole Porter referring to cocaine as "perfume from Spain" because he was unable to sing "I get no kick from cocaine" on the radio. The musician elaborated: "We decided that if anyone found out about ecstasy – and we didn't actually think that anybody would – then we'd have to call it 'eggs for tea' or something. Which is a stupid way of thinking – or a stupid inspiration for a song."

== Release and promotion ==
Released by 10 Records on 21 June 1986, "Perfume from Spain" was Dr Calculus' second single. An industry reviewer described it as the "colourful forerunner" to the album and commented that it could be the first single to bring Sleng Teng rhythms to the UK Singles Chart. The single topped the Coventry Evening Telegraph weekly top tips, and Duffy expected it to crack Radio 1's newly reformatted playlists, but the song failed to attract radio play, and did not chart in the UK. Duffy and Freeman were disappointed that Radio 1 did not play it, the latter reasoning that it may have been because disc jockeys could not talk over the intro or end of the song, as they "get used to a certain thing on the radio". As "Programme 7" had been a dance hit in the United States, Duffy wished to sell imported copies of "Perfume from Spain" in the country, jokingly referring to Designer Beatnik as "the perfect college LP – the yuppie Sgt Pepper." Designer Beatnik was released by 10 on 4 August 1986, and did not chart in the UK. Dr Calculus had no plans for live performances, although they did contemplate one large gig with a large personnel.

== Critical reception ==
Professional ratings
Review scores
Source	Rating
Record Mirror	3.5/5 stars

In his contemporary review for Music Week, Emden described Designer Beatnik as a "curious multi-layered splash of colour" and believed it deserved a better commercial fate than the "Perfume from Spain" single, writing: "Occasionally danceable with sleng teng and jazzy moments, always fun to listen to – with more humour in the editing than a whole month's worth of most releases." Tim Pedley of Newcastle's Evening Chronicle praised it for being an "exploratory rock" album which "refreshingly veers off the straight and narrow to produce an original sound, sometimes brilliant sometimes silly, but never dull." Noel Salzman of LA Weekly also recommended the record.

Reviewing Designer Beatnik for Record Mirror, Di Cross dubbed it a "truly 'modern' record, scratched and sculptured into an aural masterpiece" by Duffy, Freeman and their "equally unorthodox cohorts", including Lee, Moore and Gigandet. She named the two singles and "Killed by Poetry" as highlights, but cautioned that parts of the record which may initially intrigue listeners would not necessarily become "something you're going to want to give continuous rotation to". A reviewer for Middleton Guardian called it "a witty, varied and entertaining debut" that draws on a plethora of musical styles and sounds, and described the lyrics as "total nonsense, and not just because some of them are in French." They wrote: "It's the sort of record you dip into every now and again, because playing the whole thing all at once is too much." John Lee of Huddersfield Daily Examiner calls Dr Calculus an "unlikely" collaboration between Duffy and the former Pigbag horn section, resulting in "a rather unusual album of minority listening." He commented that the album sounds as though it was enjoyable to make, but was less convinced of its musical value or commercial viability.

Robin Denselow of The Guardian recommended the album to those seeking "something a little more quirky and different", but disliked it himself, considering it to be "a collection of unexceptional, half-hearted, light-hearted funk with a few reasonable horn selections thrown in," mixed with found noises, voiceovers and "a few drifting patches from what sounds like mood music from a dull art film." He did however praise the "reasonably amusing title". Graham Moore of Salford City Reporter described it as "an oddball album" that would only appeal to curious record buyers. He initially considered it to be a "load of pretentious nonsense", but conceded that he was "taking it a little seriously", adding: "I still didn't enjoy it but at least I stopped having a fit in the front room." Adrian Booth of Bristol's Evening Post dismissed it as a "fussy, over-elaborate" record that contains "too many ideas for its own good, though there are seductive moments in among all the business."

== Legacy and influence ==
Following the release of Designer Beatnik, Dr Calculus abandoned work on a new song, "Wild Bohemians", rendering it their final project. Duffy has commented that the album was "too much for people to get their heads around" and that he received no feedback from other musicians, but notes the appearance of the album's snare sound on Swing Out Sister's hit single "Breakout" (1986). In 2007, he described the record as "so of its time – the fact that you'd just be waking down the road recording stuff. It was so left field – too left field, really". In 2022, he reflected that the album was "an amazing thing to do" and that the recording process continued to inform his work, but noted that following its original release, he no longer felt the need to "experiment" and returned to more conventional idioms. He did however consider one of his songs with Robbie Williams, "Tripping" (2005), to be a "speeded up" version of "Perfume from Spain".

Ian Peel of Record Collector describes Designer Beatnik as "proto-acid house", elaborating that it "was acid house (with added trombones) and ambient house, four years before the terms were coined." In a 2014 interview with Classic Pop, Freeman argued that the album inspired The KLF's Chill Out (1990), both musically and in terms of the duo's "floppy-eared Elma Fudd trapper hat and dark glasses look". The magazine noted that the KLF's use of strings, sounds and emergent technology on Chill Out to create a continuous mix bore "uncanny" stylistic and structural similarities to Designer Beatnik. Peel described the ecstasy-themed lyrics of "Perfume from Spain" as a wittier precursor to The Shamen's "Ebeneezer Goode" (1992). Writing in 2022, Reynolds describes Designer Beatnik as a "joyful Jackson Pollock spatter" and "one of the strangest albums of [Duffy's] or anyone else's career".

== Track listing ==
All songs written by Dr Calculus.

=== Side one ===
1. "Blasted with Ecstasy" – 7:11
2. "Programme 7" – 3:17
3. "Moments of Being (Interlude)" – 1:09
4. "Killed by Poetry" – 4:10
5. "Moments of Being (Reprisal)" – 2:33
6. "Man" – 4:33

=== Side two ===
7. "Dream Machine" – 4:36
8. "Candy Floss Pink" – 3:17
9. "Just Another Honey" – 4:54
10. "Designer Beatnik" – 4:14
11. "Perfume from Spain" – 5:09

== Personnel ==
Adapted from the liner notes of Designer Beatnik.

- Dr Calculus – writers, composers
- Stephen Duffy – guitar, bass guitar, drums, percussion, finger cymbals, piano, synthesisers (DX7, Emulator and Fairlight), producer
- Roger Freeman – vocals, trombone, piano, percussion, producer
- Paul Staveley O'Duffy – producer
- Olly Moore – baritone saxophone, tenor saxophone
- Izumi Kobayashi – synthesisers (Emulator and T8)
- Chris Lee – trumpet
- Francoise Gigandet – vocals
- Guy Pratt – bass guitar ("Just Another Honey", "Perfume from Spain")
- Nick Duffy – violin ("Just Another Honey")
- Junior Gee – rap ("Perfume from Spain)"
