= Angeline Morrison =

British musician, singer and academic

Angeline Morrison is a British multi-instrumentalist musician, songwriter and academic.

== Life ==
Angeline Morrison was born to a Jamaican mother and a Scottish father from the Outer Hebrides. She attended her first folk club at the age of 17, and became active in the Midlands music scene. She lives in Truro, Cornwall.

Morrison performs and records under her own name and as The Ambassadors of Sorrow. She is half of the duos We Are Muffy (with Nick Duffy of The Lilac Time), and Rowan: Morrison (with The Rowan Amber Mill). She also sings with freakbeat band The Mighty Sceptres (along with Nick Radford, who has also released music and collaborated with Morrison as Frootful).

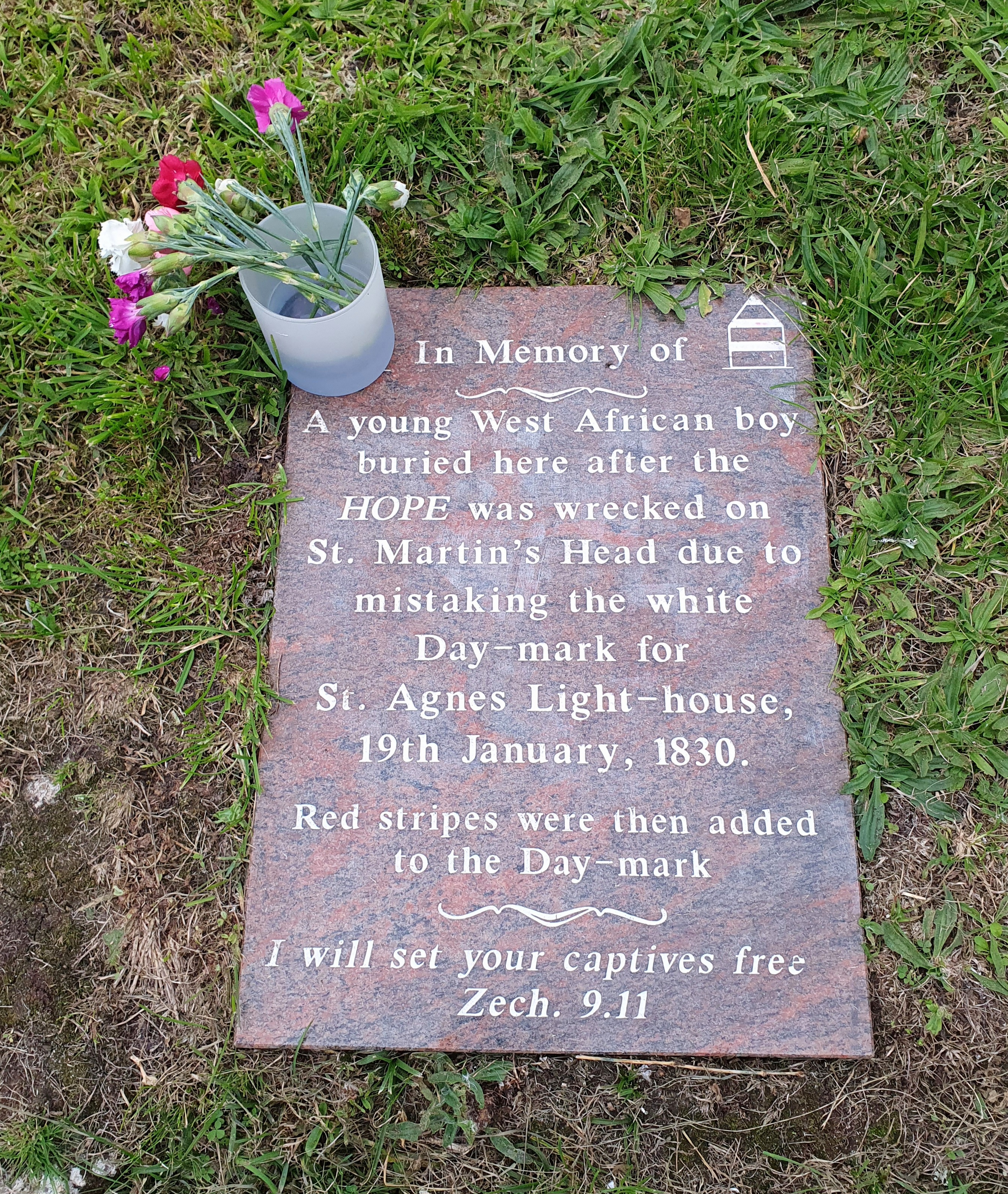
West African boy memorial

Morrison produced her self-released album The Brown Girl and Other Folk Songs (2022), with performances and additional mixing by Nick Duffy.

Her album The Sorrow Songs (2022), produced by Eliza Carthy, takes a series of stories from Black British history and situates them in the tradition of British folk music. The album's first song, 'Unknown African Boy (d.1830)' is told from the perspective of the mother of an eight-year-old West African boy, who was washed up on shore on the Isles of Scilly, when the slave ship Hope was wrecked there. Morrison performed the song on Later... with Jools Holland in 2022.

== Discography ==
=== Solo albums ===
- The Ambassadors of Sorrow, Easterly. 2009.
- The Ambassadors of Sorrow, There Is No Ending. 2011.
- Are You Ready Cat?. Freestyle Records, 2013.
- The Brown Girl and Other Folk Songs. Self-released, 2022.
- The Sorrow Songs: Folk Songs of Black British Experience. Topic Records, 2022.
- Ophelia. Self-released online, 2022.
- Ophelia. Re-released on CD and vinyl, 2024.

== Collaborations ==
- Lack of Afro, This time. La Baleine Distribution, 2011.
- The Mighty Sceptres, All hail the Mighty Sceptres!. Ubiquity, 2015.
- We Are Muffy, The Charcoal Pool. Tapete Records, 2018.
- We Are Muffy, Lost Things Returning. Country Mile Records, 2024.
- Matthew Edwards, Hark. Last Tape Recordings, 2024.

=== with The Rowan Amber Mill (as Rowan : Morrison) ===
- as Angeline Morrison and The Rowan Amber Mill, Silent Night Songs for a Cold Winter's Evening, 2014
- Rowan : Morrison, Fields of Frost, 2019
- Rowan : Morrison, In the Sunshine We Rode the Horses, 2019
- Rowan : Morrison, Lost in Seaburgh,2020
- Rowan : Morrison, Bride of the Wintertide, 2021
- Rowan : Morrison, In the Sunshine We Rode the Horses, 2022 (Extended Double Album version)
