= Al-Hijrah School =

Location
- Cherrywood Centre, Burbidge Road; Birmingham, West Midlands, B9 4US; England; 52°28′51″N 1°51′13″W

Information
- Type: Voluntary aided school
- Motto: Excellence in Motion and Bringing out the best
- Religious affiliation: Sunni Islam
- Established: 1988
- Founder: Mohammad Abdul Karim Saqib
- Local authority: Birmingham City Council
- Department for Education URN: 133306 Tables
- Ofsted: Reports
- Gender: Mixed-sex (segregated)
- Age: 4 to 16
- Enrolment: 767 as of December 2015
- Colour: blue
- Website: ahef.co.uk

Al-Hijrah School was a voluntary-aided Islamic all-through school based in the Bordesley Green area of Birmingham, England. It was a specialist Science College with 767 pupils aged 4–16. It closed 31 August 2019.

== History ==
The school was established by the Al-Hijrah Trust, a charitable organisation that was formed in Birmingham by a group of Muslims led by Mohammad Abdul Karim Saqib, on 17 July 1988. The school started in Birmingham Central Mosque, operating in three rented rooms. In 1990, the school moved to new premises at Midland House in Small Heath and, throughout the 1990s, the school continued to grow. In 1997, the Trust acquired the former Cherrywood Grammar School in Bordesley Green premises from the Birmingham Local Education Authority. The purpose-built school building was constructed in 1912 and housed the grammar school, which eventually became a comprehensive school until the buildings were closed in 1994.

The building remained empty until it was purchased and an extensive renovation programme funded by the Trust commenced. The new school buildings were opened to pupils on 1 September 1999. In autumn 2001, the school ceased being a private school and received voluntary-aided school status.

The school continued to grow and exceeding its sponsorship target of £30,000 in 2008 for small schools, receiving £58,000. Due to the success of the school, new premises were considered to allow the school to expand.

In December 2013, Al-Hijrah School was rated "inadequate" and placed in special measures by Ofsted. Amid what Ofsted called “too heavy involvement” by governors in the day-to-day running of the school, it had gone through three head teachers in the 18 months to March 2014. Soon after this, Birmingham City Council replaced the governors of the school with an interim executive board. The council has stated that the governing body had created a considerable budget deficit. In December 2014, Birmingham City Council announced that it was investigating claims that state-funding for Al-Hijrah School was diverted to set up a school in Pakistan.

In September 2016, the school was at the centre of a legal battle over alleged sex discrimination and sought to prevent publication of an Ofsted report that criticised the school for its policy of separating boys and girls at the school. In July 2017, the High Court ruled that Ofsted could name the school, but that Ofsted had been "erroneous" to claim that such separation was illegal. In July 2017, the Department of Education ordered the leadership of the school to be taken over by an independent trust after books were found in the library which said that a man can beat his wife lightly and that a wife must submit to her husband even if she doesn't want to have sex.

In 2019, Ofsted reported that gender segregation in the school was significant and ongoing, including requiring girls to wait to eat until "all the boys had finished."

The school closed on 31 August 2019. It has been succeeded by the Olive School, Small Heath, an Islamic school serving children ages 4 through 11 years.

== Pupils ==
The 285 pupils were split into separate male and female classes. 75% of pupils were of the Pakistani ethnic minority group. The school received over 1,000 applications for 60 places, making it the most over-subscribed school in the United Kingdom.
