= Nelories =

Japanese musical duo

Nelories ネロリーズ
- Origin: Nara Prefecture, Japan
- Genres: Alternative pop; indie pop; shibuya-kei
- Years active: 1990–1995
- Labels: ¡Por supuesto! / Suite¡ Supuesto!; Sugarfrost Records; Hello Recording Club
- Past members: Jun Kurihara; Kazmi Kubo

The Nelories (Nerorīzu (ネロリーズ)) were a Japanese independent alternative pop / indie pop and shibuya-kei duo, formed in 1990 by Jun Kurihara (Kurihara Jun (栗原 淳); lead vocals, accordion, keyboards) and Kazmi Kubo (Kubo Kazumi (久保 和美); guitar, backing vocals).

== History ==
The Nelories were formed in February 1990 by high school classmates Jun Kurihara and Kazmi Kubo in Nara Prefecture, Japan. Kurihara wrote her lyrics in English despite it not being her native language. Kurihara and Kubo would sometimes refer to themselves as Jun and Kazmi "de Nelorie" ("of the Nelories"), that was most likely inspired by the Ramones.

Around this time, Kurihara also befriended Akiko, co-founder of the Liverpool-based indie label Sugarfrost Records. In late 1991, the duo signed with Tokyo independent label ¡Por supuesto! and released their debut EP, Plasticky, in November 1991. Their debut album, Mellow Yellow Fellow Nelories, was released in 1992, while the duo was in college and produced by Masato Tsuruta alongside the band.

In 1993, the duo gained North American distribution when musician John Flansburgh (of They Might Be Giants) included them in the Hello CD of the Month Club, releasing a self-titled EP in the US. In July 1993, the band performed live in New York City.

The Nelories also collaborated with members of British post-punk group The Monochrome Set. Frontman Bid (Ganesh Seshadri) and past keyboardist / guitarist Alex Orson Presence produced the duo's 1993 EP Indie Pop Car Baby and their second album Daisy (1994), that were engineered by Toby Hrycek-Robinson.

On March 14, 1993, the Nelories recorded a session at BBC Radio 1 for John Peel's show. Tracks from this session were later released on their 1995 EP An Ordinary Miracle. The band released their third album, Starboogie, under Suite¡ Supuesto! (Toshiba EMI) before disbanding around 1995–1996.

== Later activities ==
Both Kurihara and Kubo have continued their careers in music following the Nelories' disband. Kazmi Kubo formed the side project Kazmi With Rickies in 1996, releasing an album Who in 1996 under Suite¡ Supuesto! and several mini-albums, featuring ASA-CHANG (Asa-Chang & Junray), Yuji Nagayama (Piranhans), Hideki Kaji (Fleur de Violetta), Jai Okada (played with Asa-Chang & Junray), and the DJ Moog Yamamoto, before retiring from public music performance, while Jun Kurihara launched a solo career, releasing her debut solo album Tsuki no Ou (月の王; King of the Moon) on February 5, 1997. She moved to San Francisco in 1999 and formed the solo project Moonrace. In 2005, through an introduction by Bid of The Monochrome Set, Kurihara joined the San Francisco indie pop band The Music Lovers as accordionist and vocalist, appearing on The Music Lovers' Guide for Young People (2006). In 2007, she formed the group Raymonda.

== Discography ==
=== Studio albums ===
Year	Album Details	Tracklist	Personnel & Credits
1992	Mellow Yellow Fellow Nelories: Label: ¡Por supuesto! (Japan) (STAP-0208); Format: CD	1. "Waiting"; 2. "Banana"; 3. "Plastic Sky"; 4. "No Love Lost"; 5. "Go Go Merry-Go-Round"; 6. "Neutral Blue"; 7. "Bubbly"; 8. "Emerald"; 8. "Trampoline"; 10. "JPG"	Jun Kurihara – vocals, accordion; Kazmi Kubo – guitars, backing vocals; Producers: Masato Tsuruta, Nelories
1994	Daisy: Label: Suite¡ Supuesto! / Toshiba EMI (Japan) (TOCT-8299); Format: CD	1. "Daydreamers"; 2. "Set Pure Ven"; 3. "Desperate"; 4. "A Girl in a Checkered Dress"; 5. "Ringhanger"; 6. "Indie Pop Car Baby"; 7. "You Saved Me"; 8. "Un Revolver A Six Coups"; 9. "Garlic"; 10 "Fireblade Sky"; 11."Daisy"; 12. "Eyes & Shoes"	Producers: Bid, Alex Orson Presence; Recording Engineer: Toby Hrycek-Robinson; Guest Artists: John Dickinson, Gemma Townley, Annelise Zimmerman, Dannie Walker, Lan Wright, Alison Balsom, Gabe Gibson, Chrissy Quayle, Walter Wray, Alisdair Montgomery, Margarita Gluzberg, Milosz Bartlomiej
1994 / 1995	Starboogie: Label: Suite¡ Supuesto! / EMI (Japan) (TOCT 8784); Format: CD	1. "Too Late Or Not Too Late"; 2. "Popstars"; 3. "Starboogie"; 4. "So Anyway I Sing"; 5. "I Like Your Hair"; 6. "White Volkswagen"; 7. "Service Area"; 8. "Blue Flower"; 9. "The Shooting Pictures"; 10. "Don't Make Any Promise"; 11. "Roseland"	Jun Kurihara – vocals, accordion, keyboards; Kazmi Kubo – guitars, harmonies; Guest Artists: Naruyoshi Kikuchi (Tenor Saxophone), Kito Octet (Strings), ASA-CHANG (Drums, percussion), Yuji Nagayama (Bass), Shigekazu Aida (Bass), Megumi Mashiro (Backing Vocals); Executive Producer: Nelories, ASA-CHANG

=== EPs ===
Year	EP Details	Tracklist	Notes
1991	Plasticky: Label: ¡Por supuesto! (Japan) (STAP-0102)	1. "The Chestnutfield Family"; 2. "Keith"; 3. "Plasticky"; 4. "Cadillac For Montevideo"	Debut EP released in November 1991.
1992	Banana: Label: Sugarfrost Records (UK) (Frosty 4) / ¡Por supuesto! (Japan) (STAP-0207)	1. "Banana"; 2. "Emerald"; 3. "Trampolene"; 4. "Run Free" (Japanese bonus track)	UK distribution via Liverpool-based Sugarfrost Records.
1993	Nelories: Label: Hello Recording Club (US) (HEL-34)	1. "Waiting"; 2. "Banana"; 3. "Bubbly"; 4. "Plastic Sky"	Produced by John Flansburgh.
1993	Indie Pop Car Baby: Label: Suite¡ Supuesto! (Japan) (TOCT-8249)	1. "Indie Pop Car Baby"; 2. "Your Smile"; 3. "Hell Toupee"; 4. "An Ordinary Miracle"; 5. "Indie Pop Car Baby" (demo)	Produced by Bid and Alex Orson Presence (The Monochrome Set).
1995	An Ordinary Miracle: Label: Suite¡ Supuesto! (Japan) (TOCT-8464)	1. "An Ordinary Miracle" (live); 2. "An Ordinary Miracle" (Pimlico mix); 3. "Run Free" (The Peel Sessions); 4. "Garlic" (The Peel Sessions)	Includes official recordings from their March 14, 1993 BBC Radio 1 John Peel Session.
2018	1990 Demo EP: Label: Fish Prints (US) (RD 001)	1. "The Chestnutfield Family" (demo); 2. "Cadillac For Montevideo" (demo); 3. "Glass Chocolate"; 4. "Keith" (demo); 5. "May"; 6. "Plasticky" (demo)	Band's original 1990 demo cassette. Features Yohjiro on bass guitar.

=== Singles ===
Year	Title	Label & Format	Tracks	Notes
1994	Popstars: Label: Suite¡ Supuesto! (Japan) (TOCT-4003)	1. "Popstars"; 2. "For A Friend"; 3. "La Cerveza"	Lead EP for the Starboogie album cycle.	
1994	"Eyes And Shoes"	Sugarfrost Records (UK) (7", Frosty 10)	A-Side: "Eyes And Shoes"; B-Side: "Fireblade Sky"	Official UK single release.
