= Opposition to the English Defence League =

Actions taken against the English Defence League

The English Defence League was a far-right social movement against Islam and its adherents. Bartlett and Lister noted that the EDL represented "the biggest populist street movement in a generation" in Britain. Braouezec referred to the EDL as the "spearhead" of "the new populist, nationalist and anti-Islamist movement" in Britain, comparing it in this respect to Bloc Identitaire in France. In 2011, James Treadwell and Jon Garland described the formation of the EDL as "one of the most notable political developments of the past few years". They were of the view that the EDL had been adept at exploiting the "anger, marginalization, alienation and frustration felt by many young men in deprived white working-class". In 2013, the political scientist Julian Richards expressed the view that the EDL had been "one of the more intriguing developments on the Far Right in recent years", while the political scientists Matthew J. Goodwin, David Cutts, and Laurence Janta-Lipinski suggested that from its formation until 2013, it had represented "the most significant anti-Islam movement in Europe". Meadowcroft and Morrow noted that the EDL revived the tradition of far-right street-based protest marches after ten years in which they had been comparatively rare, while at the same time initiating "a new era of Islamophobic protest movements" such as Britain First and Pegida UK.

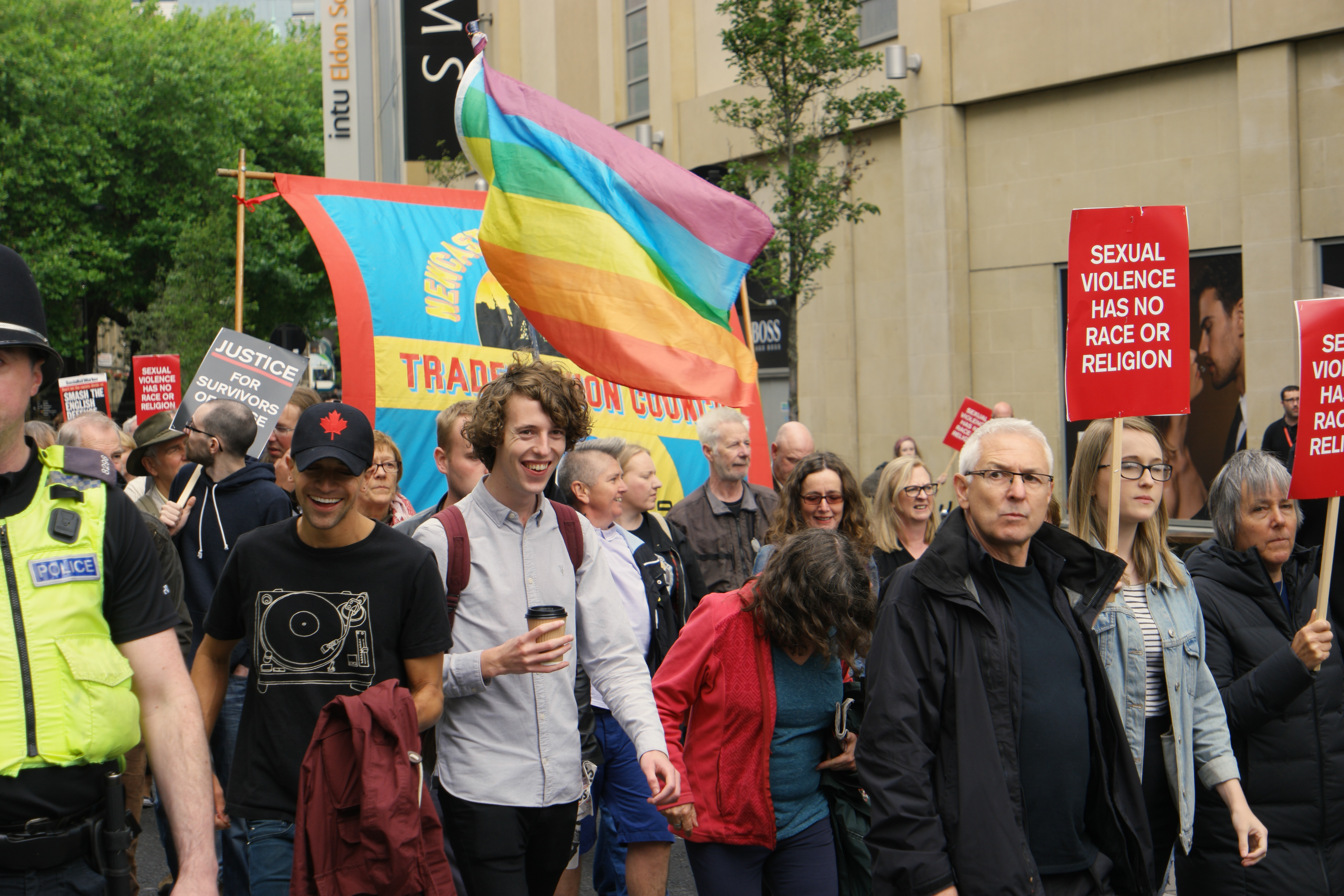
Counter-protest to the EDL organised by the Unite trade union, held in Newcastle in 2017

The EDL's rhetoric both resonated with and fed into broader animosity towards Muslims that existed in British society. The 2010 British Social Attitudes Survey found that 45% of respondents believed that religious diversity was having a negative impact on British society, and that 55% would be bothered by having a mosque built in their street, to only 15% who felt the same about a church. A cross-European survey published in 2011 found that 48% of British citizens agreed with the statement that Islam was "a religion of intolerance". Trilling attributed this sentiment to parts of the British mainstream media, stating that the EDL had been "nourished by the drip-feed of anti-Muslim, anti-'political correctness' stories in Britain's press"; Garland and Treadwell noted that ideas and attitudes akin to those of the EDL could often be found in such popular tabloids as the Daily Mail, The Sun, and the Daily Star. Goodwin suggested that the fact that the EDL emerged at a time when "sections of the media and the British establishment... [were] relatively sympathetic towards Islamophobia" reflected a distinct difference from the heyday of the National Front in the 1970s, for at that time, "very few newspapers of politicians were endorsing the NF's antisemitic message." At the same time, the majority of the British population at the time of the EDL's height did not share the totality of its views on Islam.

Those outside the EDL typically perceived the group as being fascist, racist, or mindlessly violent. A poll by Extremis and YouGov conducted in October 2012 found that only a third of those surveyed had heard of the EDL, and that of those who had, only 11% would consider joining. Of those who had heard of it, 74% thought that the group was racist, and 85% stated they would never join it. The historian of the far right Nigel Copsey noted that the EDL "does not represent the values which underpin our communities and our country: respect for our fellow citizens, respect for difference, and ensuring the safety and peace of communities and local areas." The EDL faced derision from much of the mainstream media in Britain, with EDL members expressing anger at how they felt the mainstream media misrepresented them by, for instance, ignoring positive aspects of the group or by interviewing those members at demonstrations who were evidently drunk, unintelligent, and unarticulate. A number of academic studies of the movement were produced, many of them focusing on the attitudes and ideology of EDL supporters.

== Government and state responses ==
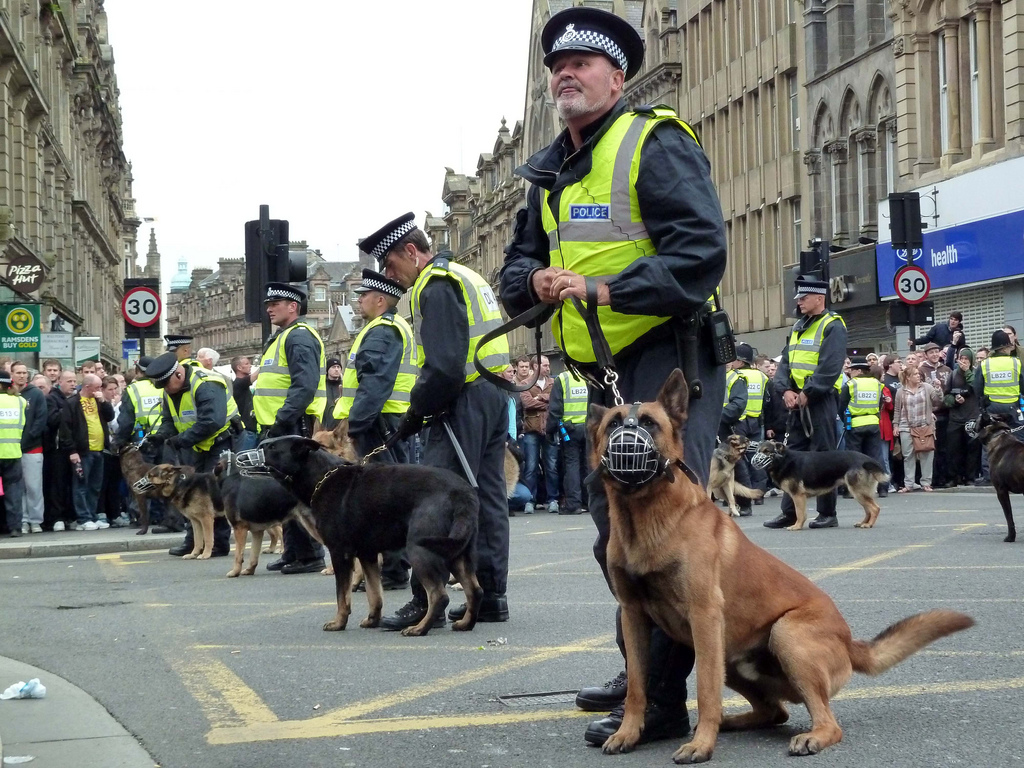
Police with police dogs in attendance at an EDL demonstration

The government regarded the EDL as a major threat to societal cohesion and integration, and there were fears that the group was seeking to spark racial-aggravated urban disturbances akin to those which had broken out in parts of Britain in 2001. In September 2009, the UK's Communities Secretary John Denham condemned the EDL, comparing its tactics to those used by the British Union of Fascists in the 1930s. To combat the white working class resentment that was feeding into support for the BNP and EDL, he invested £12 million into the "Connecting Communities" programme. During the campaign run-up to the 2010 general election, the Conservative Party leader—and subsequent Prime Minister—David Cameron referred to the EDL as "terrible people" and added that "we would always keep these groups under review and if we needed to ban them, we would ban them or any groups which incite hatred." The Home Office minister Phil Woolas stated that the EDL deliberately engaged in "division and provocation, to try and push young Muslims into the hands of extremists, in order to perpetuate the divide. It is dangerous." In 2011, the Conservative Party suspended one of its local Southend councillors from the party after they attended an EDL rally.

Various police officers reported that the EDL's activities hampered their own counter-terror operations among British Muslim communities. Robert Lambert, co-director of the University of Exeter's European Muslim Research Centre (EMRC) stated that the EDL undermined efforts by British Muslims to tackle terrorism and extremism.

== Anti-fascist, Islamic, and ethnic minority responses ==
The EDL's events attracted a varied range of counter-protesters, the foremost among them being Unite Against Fascism (UAF). The UAF organised to combat the EDL on both an intellectual and physical level, in this way mirroring the actions of the Anti-Nazi League in countering the National Front in 1970s Britain. Dominated by the Socialist Workers Party, the UAF understood the EDL through a largely Marxist interpretation, regarding its members as "fascist, racist thugs" and believing that it represented an "embryonic pogrom movement". The UAF believed in the need to oppose the EDL at every juncture, countering it with larger numbers at every opportunity and thus demoralising it; like the EDL, it stressed that protests should be peaceful, and blamed the arrest of some of its own protesters on heavy-handed policing. At counter-protests, the UAF's common chant was "Fascist scum off our streets". Copsey suggested that the UAF's approach of directly countering the EDL during its marches gave the EDL exactly what it wanted, enhancing the opportunity for violent confrontation and providing it with the oxygen of publicity. He further argued that such a strategy risked serious injury or death and that in such a scenario it would contribute to further radicalisation on all sides. Jackson similarly thought that the UAF's approach was likely to result in "tit for tat radicalisation".

Another anti-fascist group, Hope not Hate, differed from the UAF in not believing that every EDL rally must meet forceful opposition. It expressed the view that "demonstrations and pickets have their place but they should be a tactic not dogmatic rule", instead arguing that anti-fascists should discuss what tactics might be appropriate for a certain locality with members of its local community before the EDL held their protest there. Hope not Hate foregrounded the need to establish long-term strategies to counter the EDL and far-right politics, establishing links with Labour and to a lesser extent other political parties and focusing on reconnecting disenfranchised people with the established political process. When it has helped to organise counter-protests against the EDL, Hope not Hate often focused on bringing together different sectors of a local community in peaceful protest; in Bradford in August 2010, for instance, it helped organise a counter-protest featuring members of the Christian, Muslim, Sikh, and Hindu communities. Online, various leftist websites have also played a role in monitoring the EDL's activities, including Indymedia, Lancaster Unity, 1 Million United, and IslamophobiaWatch.

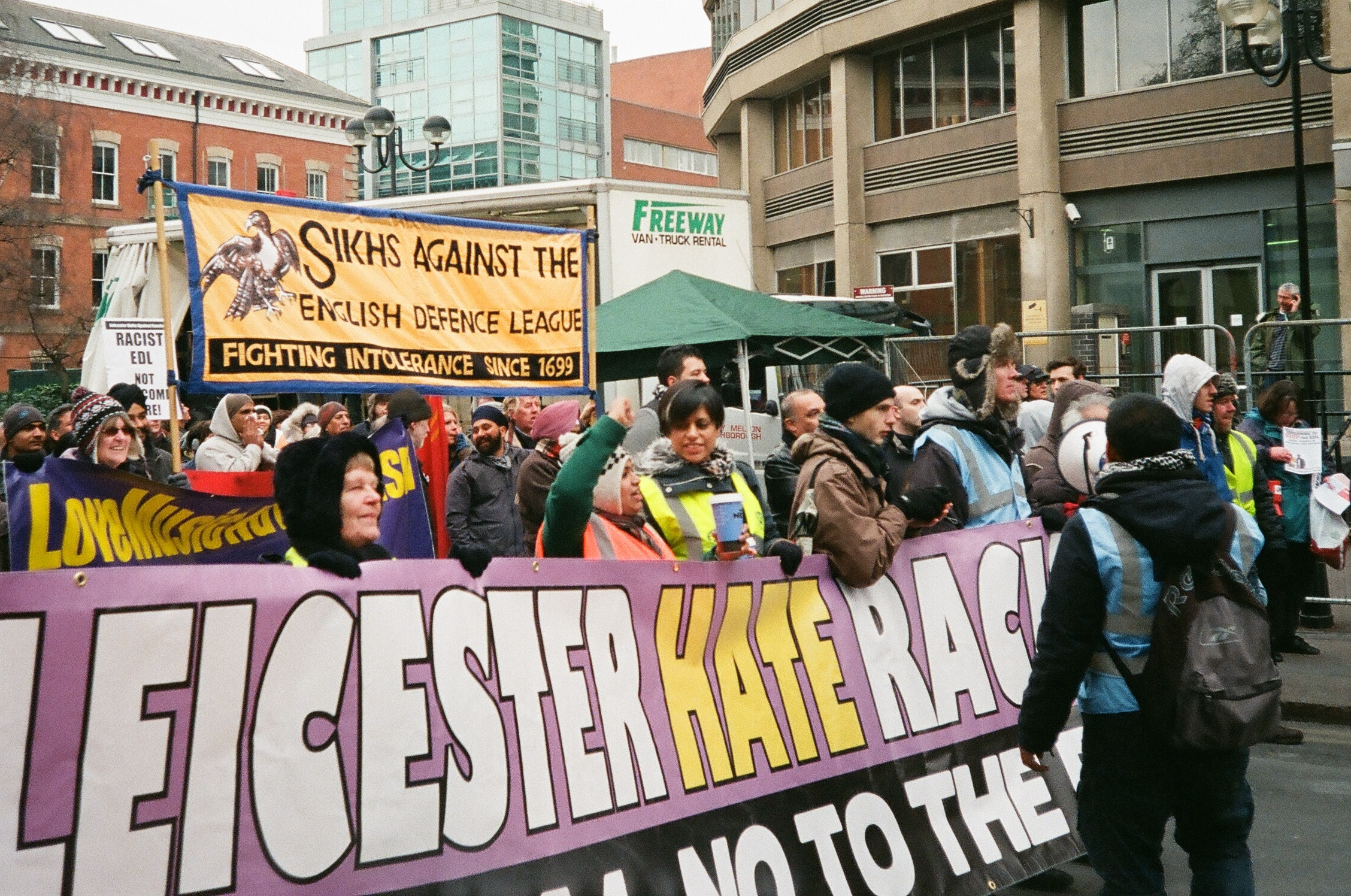
Counter-protest to the EDL held in Leicester in 2012

Britain's Islamic community was divided on how to deal with he EDL. In some cases, Muslims joined in with UAF counter-protests; when the EDL planned to march in Birmingham in September 2009, the head of the Birmingham Central Mosque, Muhammad Nasee, urged Muslims to do so against police advice. Other Muslim voices have called for the Muslim community to stay away from the protests, and to keep their young people off the streets while they are going on. When an EDL protest was planned in Leicester, for example, the Federation of Muslim Organisations issued a statement saying that "Our strong advice is that people stay away from the EDL protest and any counter demonstration and rallies that may take place in the city." Another response was the formation of the Muslim Defence League in January 2010, the stated purpose of which was to oppose Islamophobia and counter misinformation about Islam. In various instances, it supported UAF counter-protests against EDL marches. In 2013, six Islamists pleaded guilty to plotting a bomb and gun attack on an EDL march in Dewsbury.

In response to the involvement of some Sikhs in the EDL, an organisation known as Sikhs Against the EDL was formed; it condemned Guramit Singh as a "traitor" for not opposing the "racism and fascism espoused by the EDL". After the EDL founded its Jewish Division, the Board of Deputies of British Jews expressed disappointment; its chief executive Jon Benjamin stated that he EDL's support for Israel was "empty and duplicitous" and that his group rejected the EDL's "Islamophobia and hatred". In 2010, the Association of Pakistani Lawyers asked the government to ban the EDL outright, although this was not done. As noted by Copsey, this would have been difficult, for the EDL did not openly glorify terrorism and thus could not be proscribed under Britain's counter-terrorism legislation; additionally, he thought that were the EDL to be banned, a very similar group would have simply taken its place.
