= Paradise Circus =

Paradise Circus may mean:

- Paradise, Birmingham, formerly known as Paradise Circus
- Four Walls / Paradise Circus a musical collaboration between Massive Attack and Burial
- Paradise Circus (album), a 1989 album by the Lilac Time
