= Matthew Edwards (musician) =

English singer and songwriter

Matthew "Ted" Edwards is a UK-born singer and songwriter and previously led the San Francisco-based pop group called The Music Lovers and art-pop band Matthew Edwards and the Unfortunates. Edwards now records as a solo artist.

== Early life ==
Originally from Small Heath, Birmingham, England, Edwards attended university to study English literature. In 1991, Edwards left his hometown and relocated to San Francisco, California, where he worked as a compere in the city's premier 'variety' evening at The Mad Dog.

== Music career ==
=== The Hairdressers ===
Edwards' rock band The Hairdressers released the album 'Our Lives in Showbusiness' in 1999.

=== The Music Lovers ===
While working as an MC, Edwards met bassist Jon Brooder and brought in an old friend from Birmingham, Paul Comaskey on drums, completing the first lineup of the band. In 2003, Edwards formed The Music Lovers for whom he was the singer, guitarist, and songwriter. Between 2003 and 2009, Edwards released three albums and an EP on Le Grand Magistery Records out of Detroit, Michigan. The albums were also released in Japan (Enough-Ho) and Italy (Sleeping Star). The band toured the East and West Coast of the US and Italy. Each record had distinctive sleeve designs by Matthew Jacobson, incorporating images by Albert and David Maysles, Elliott Erwitt, and Alan Crawford. The records received much critical acclaim. Edwards dissolved the band in 2010.

=== Matthew Edwards and the Unfortunates ===
In 2013, Edwards formed the Matthew Edwards and the Unfortunates, a six-piece group from San Francisco, California, which featured current and previous members of Ladybug Transistor, Assemble Head in Sunburst Sound, and The Music Lovers. The Unfortunates borrowed its name from the cult book by English writer B.S. Johnson.

The first Unfortunates album 'The Fates' (2013) was released by Last Tape Recordings (CA) and was produced by Eric Drew Feldman (PJ Harvey, Captain Beefheart) who also contributed keyboards. It was recorded at Ex'pression in Emeryville, California. The album featured Fred Frith on Guitar. Also featuring on keyboards and vocals was Sasha Bell from the group The Essex Green. The sleeve was designed by American artist Rex Ray.

In 2014, Edwards relocated to his hometown of Birmingham, England and convened the UK version of the band. This group recorded the Unfortunates second album 'Folklore' which was released by Gare Du Nord (Ian Button) in June 2017. Like its predecessor it included the contribution of Fred Frith (Robert Wyatt, Eno), and Dagmar Krause (Slapp Happy, Henry Cow). The album was recorded and mixed by John A. Rivers at Woodbine Street Recording Studio.

In 2019, the group signed to Parisian label December Square who released their third album 'The Birmingham Poets.' Edwards promoted the record with tours of France and the UK (with Nouvelle Vague). The album featured the contribution of Dagmar Krause. The group also appeared with Robyn Hitchcock and The Unthanks.

Edwards led the Unfortunates from 2013 to 2020 in San Francisco and England.

=== Matthew Edwards and the Futurists ===
In 2019, Edwards retired the Unfortunates name after the death of close collaborator Derick Simmonds and his relocation back to California after five years in his native Birmingham. In June 2020, the Futurists released 'The First Song of the Revolution' EP on British record label Static Caravan Records.

A second Futurists single, 'Suit/Kindness', was released on Last Tape Recordings in 2024.

=== Matthew Edwards (solo) ===
During COVID lock down, Edwards wrote and recorded a solo record, 'Hark', where he collaborated with long-time confederate Isaac Bonnell. The album was released on Last Tape Recordings in October 2025. The album featured contributions from Angeline Morrison and Erin Moran.

== Discography ==
=== The Hairdressers ===
- 1999 – 'Our Lives in Showbusiness' – Musette Records. MUS4

=== The Music Lovers ===
- 2003 – 'Cheap Songs Tell the Truth' (EP) – Le Grand Magistery/Marriage Records iDo-3
- 2004 – 'The Words We Say Before We Sleep' – Le Grand Magistery/Marriage Records iDo-4
- 2006 – 'The Music Lovers Guide for Young People' – Le Grand Magistery Records (US) HRH-038, Enougho (JA)
- 2009 - 'Masculine Feminine' – Le Grand Magistery Records HRH-046 (US) Sleeping Star (IT)

=== Matthew Edwards and the Unfortunates ===
- 2013 – 'The Fates' (Last Tape Recordings) LTR02 CD (Metal
- 2015 – 'Minotaur/Bad Blood' 7-inch single (Metal Postcard Records) MP92
- 2017 – 'Folklore' (Gare Du Nord Records) GDNLPo14
- 2019 – 'The Birmingham Poets' (December Square Records FR) DESQ002

=== Matthew Edwards and the Futurists ===
- 2020 – 'The First Song of the Revolution' EP (Static Caravan Records) VAN 348
- 2024 – 'Suit/Kindness' – 7 inch single (Last Tape Recordings) LTR02

=== Matthew Edwards (solo) ===
- 2024 – 'Hark' (Last Tape Recordings) LTR03 LP, CD and cassette
