= Birmingham Central Mosque =

Mosque in Birmingham, England, United Kingdom

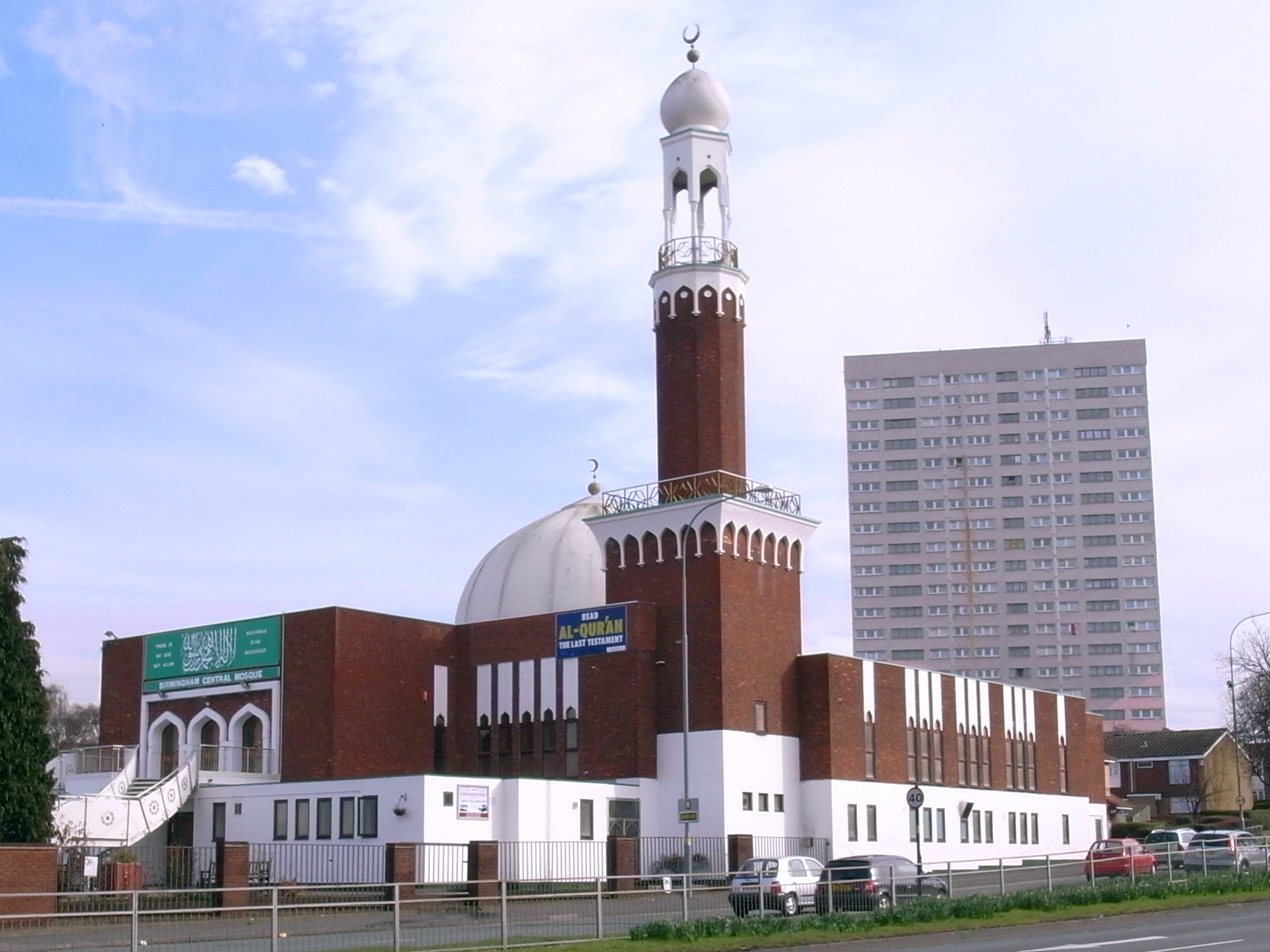

Religion
- Affiliation: Islam

Location
- Location: Highgate, Birmingham, England
- Interactive map of Birmingham Central Mosque

Architecture
- Type: Mosque
- Completed: 1975

Specifications
- Capacity: 6,000 (including women)
- Dome: 1
- Minaret: 2

Website
- www.centralmosque.org.uk/

Birmingham Central Mosque, is a mosque in the Highgate area of Birmingham, England, run by the Birmingham Mosque Trust. The organization, 'Muslims in Britain’ classify the Birmingham Central Mosque as, nonsectarian. The mosque has a capacity of 6,000, including women. The mosque provides a Sharia Council which in 2016 handled 400 requests for divorce.

The mosque has 21 listed trustees, and its Chair is Muhammad Afzal. Its Vice Chairman is Mohammed Najib.

== History ==
A golden dome was added to the top of the minaret in 1981. In 1986, the mosque sought and was granted permission to call prayer within certain limits. Between 1988 and 1990, Al-Hijrah School educated children in three rented rooms within the mosque before moving to Midland House in Small Heath.

In 2006, the West Midlands Fire Service put out a fire in the mosque which began in an office in the building. It did not spread far, yet it caused damage to electronics and also destroyed paperwork.

In December 2011 a man was arrested after making a Facebook threat to bomb the mosque.

Following a protest by the English Defence League (EDL) in April 2017, the Birmingham Central Mosque held a tea party with the goal of countering those demonstrations and promoting interfaith dialogue. The tea party ended up receiving more participants than the original EDL march.

== See also ==
- Ghamkol Shariff Masjid
- Islam in the United Kingdom
- Islamic schools and branches
- Islamic Sharia Council
- List of mosques in the United Kingdom
