= Paradise Circus (album) =

Studio album by the Lilac Time
- Released: 9 October 1989
- Recorded: 1989
- Genres: Pop rock; indie pop; folk-pop
- Length: 44:07
- Labels: Fontana; Mercury
- Producers: Stephen Duffy; Tony Phillips

The Lilac Time chronology
The Lilac Time (1987)	Paradise Circus (1989)	& Love for All (1990)

Singles from Paradise Circus
- 1. "American Eyes" Released: 1989; 2. "The Days of the Week" Released: 1989; 3. "The Girl Who Waves at Trains" Released: 1989

Paradise Circus is the second album by English band the Lilac Time and was released by Fontana Records in October 1989. Initially intended to be a double album, consisting of one album of songs by band leader Stephen Duffy and one of instrumentals, it ended up being condensed into a single album at the record company's insistence. The album is regarded by critics as being bolder and fuller-sounding than the Lilac Time's first album, with a greater country & western influence.

== Recording ==
In early 1989, the Lilac Time's record company Fontana/Phonogram asked the band to begin recording their second album. The band had hoped to record it at their country retreat in the Malvern Hills, but Phonogram insisted that it be recorded in a modern studio not far from the company's London headquarters instead.

The band intended the record to be a double album titled Tree, with one album consisting of singer-songwriter Stephen Duffy's songs and one of instrumentals, primarily composed by his brother Nick. Fontana refused and the record instead became a single album, with the revised title of Paradise Circus, made up of twelve tracks written by Stephen and one by Nick. Many of the instrumentals that were recorded during the sessions instead saw release on the B-sides of the singles taken from Paradise Circus and its follow-up & Love for All, and on the first album by Nick Duffy's spin-off band Bait. When Paradise Circus was reissued in 2006, its bonus tracks included an additional twelve instrumentals from the recording sessions that had been intended for the proposed double album.

The sound that Duffy and engineer/producer Tony Phillips were attempting to achieve on the recordings was later described by Duffy as a "small folky sound without the de rigueur large ambient snare drums of the age". Duffy has recalled in interview that he had given up smoking cigarettes and cannabis during the album sessions, which he felt gave his voice an unfortunate squeaky timbre. At the urging of Phillips, Duffy resumed smoking in order to improve his voice, but the majority of his vocals on the album had already been recorded by that time.

As the recording sessions progressed, Fontana became unhappy with the music that the band had committed to tape and insisted that they return to the studio to cut more commercial songs which could be released as singles, while also urging them to "Americanize" their sound—something that was reportedly parodied by Duffy in his composing the song "American Eyes". Both "The Girl Who Waves at Trains" and "If the Stars Shine Tonight" were among the songs that the band recorded in an attempt to produce radio-friendly singles. In addition, according to Duffy, the wife of one of the Phonogram executives attached to the band disliked the sound of the pedal steel guitar, which the band had used liberally on the album. As a result, the record company insisted that the instrument be removed or lessened in volume by way of a remix, which served to both annoy the band and delay the album's release. It was further delayed by the band's unsuccessful attempts to master the album to their satisfaction in post-production. By the time Paradise Circus was issued in October 1989, it had been two years since the release of the Lilac Time's debut album and the band had already begun working on their third.

== Music ==
The music of Paradise Circus has been described by critic Tim DiGravina as being generally happy and upbeat—with the two instrumentals "Paradise Circus" and "Twilight Beer Hall", along with the sombre "She Still Loves You" and "Father Mother Wife and Child" being the exceptions. The opening track and lead single from the album, "American Eyes", has a fuller sound than anything from the Lilac Time's first album, and blends Johnny Marr-inspired jangling guitars with lyrics about unrequited love into "a wonderfully poetic and sad opener".

The second track, "The Lost Girl in the Midnight Sun", begins slowly, before building with gently ringing acoustic guitars, banjo, horns, and occasional piano.

"If the Stars Shine Tonight" has an anti-religion theme to its lyrics, with musical accompaniment that Duffy has called, "a blizzard of brass and pedal steel guitars". "The Beauty in Your Body" has been described as, "an uneasy but still beautiful listen", by DiGravina. The critic also summed up "She Still Loves You" as, "somber, dark, and pensive", before concluding that the song was, "the emotional heart of Paradise Circus."

Of "The Last to Know", DiGravina has written: "'The Last to Know' depicts a crumbling marriage with all of the trademark grace and poetry one would expect from Duffy and his bandmates. Any person who's suffered at the hands of infidelity or fallen out of love will relate to Duffy's words and perhaps marvel at how precisely the band has hit the nail on the head in presenting the emotions inherent in a crumbling relationship."

In the liner notes for the 2006 reissue of Paradise Circus, Duffy recalled that "The Girl Who Waves at Trains" was, as the title suggests, inspired by a young woman he saw waving to the train he was on, as he travelled back to Malvern from a meeting with Phonogram in London. DiGravina has stated his opinion that the prominent horns featured on the track sound, "a bit at odds with the remainder of the album", although he did call the song, "a delightful four minutes".

DiGravina was unimpressed with the song "Father Mother Wife and Child", which he interpreted as blending "quasi-religious symbols with lyrics aimed at a young son". He felt that, "the lyrics feel cumbersome and awkward", and that Duffy's imagery wasn't "quite up to par with the remainder of his discography". "Father Mother Wife and Child" incorporates the sound of the machinations and tick of Big Ben, and was inspired by the 1987 film Wings of Desire and the poetry of Rainer Maria Rilke.

== Release and reception ==
Professional ratings
Review scores
Source	Rating
AllMusic	4.5/5 stars

Paradise Circus was released on 9 October 1989 by Fontana Records, but it didn't reach the UK Albums Chart. "American Eyes" was issued as the lead single from the album in August 1989 and reached number 94 in the UK Singles Chart. Two further singles, "The Days of the Week" and "The Girl Who Waves at Trains", were issued in late 1989, but neither release charted.

The record has been described by critic Marcy Donelson as having "a bit of country & western influence". Trouser Press also noted "a country-western influence" on the album, calling it, "an attractive but less glorious album" than their debut, although one that had "fuller, smoother arrangements with horn and string accents." DiGravina has described the album as having "bolder instrumentation" and "a brighter overall atmosphere" than the band's first album, while also noting that they were "channeling the Smiths, Nick Drake, and the Byrds" into a "their own radio-friendly folk-pop style". He summed up by remarking, "the Lilac Time prove here that a great singles band can be simultaneously heady and masterful at crafting marvelous albums."

Paradise Circus was included in the NME's "Top 100 essential albums of the 80s" poll, and The Guardian included it in their "Top 100 Alternative Albums...Ever" list.

== Track listing ==
All songs on the original album are written by Stephen Duffy, except "Paradise Circus": written by Nick Duffy.

Bonus tracks songwriting credits as noted.

=== Side one ===
1. "American Eyes" – 2:32
2. "The Lost Girl in the Midnight Sun" – 3:59
3. "The Beauty in Your Body" – 3:49
4. "If the Stars Shine Tonight" – 3:40
5. "The Days of the Week" – 3:30
6. "She Still Loves You" – 3:23

=== Side two ===
1. "Paradise Circus" – 1:24
2. "The Girl Who Waves at Trains" – 4:01
3. "The Last to Know" – 2:57
4. "Father Mother Wife and Child" – 6:27
5. "The Rollercoaster Song" – 3:04
6. "Work for the Weekend" – 4:35
7. "Twilight Beer Hall" – 0:38

=== 2006 remastered CD bonus tracks ===
14. "The World in Her Arms" (Stephen Duffy) – 4:48
15. "The Queen of Heartless" (Stephen Duffy) – 2:56
16. "Ponderosa Pine" (Caroline Radcliffe) – 2:47
17. "Night Mail/Dirty Armour" (Caroline Radcliffe/Nick Duffy) – 2:28
18. "Shepherd's Plaid" (Nick Duffy) – 2:02
19. "Ounce of Nails" (Nick Duffy) – 2:10
20. "Spin á Cavalu" (Nick Duffy) – 4:38
21. "Australian Worm" (Nick Waterhouse) – 2:00
22. "On Milkwood Road" (Caroline Radcliffe) – 2:22
23. "Night Soil" (Nick Duffy) – 2:04
24. "Rubovia" (Nick Duffy) – 2:45
25. "Silver Dagger" (Traditional, arranged Caroline Radcliffe) – 1:08
26. "November" (Caroline Radcliffe) – 2:35
27. "Paradise Circus" [Old Smithy version] (Nick Duffy) – 0:52

== Personnel ==
The Lilac Time

- Stephen Duffy – acoustic guitar, electric guitar, vocals
- Nick Duffy – banjo, accordion, violin
- Michael Weston – keyboards
- Michael Giri – drums, backing vocals
- Mickey Harris – bass guitar, backing vocals
- Caroline Radcliffe – backing vocals, oboe

Additional personnel

- Kate St John – horns (on "The Girl Who Waves at Trains")
- Mark Nightingale – horns (on "The Girl Who Waves at Trains")
- Sid Gauld – horns (on "The Girl Who Waves at Trains")
- Roger Rettig – pedal steel guitar
- Nick Waterhouse – acoustic guitar (on bonus tracks 16–27)
- Glen Tommey – percussion and mixing (on bonus tracks 16–27)
