= Ghamkol Shariff Masjid =

Mosque in Birmingham, England

Coordinates: 52.4650°N 1.8585°W

Central Jamia Mosque Ghamkol Sharif
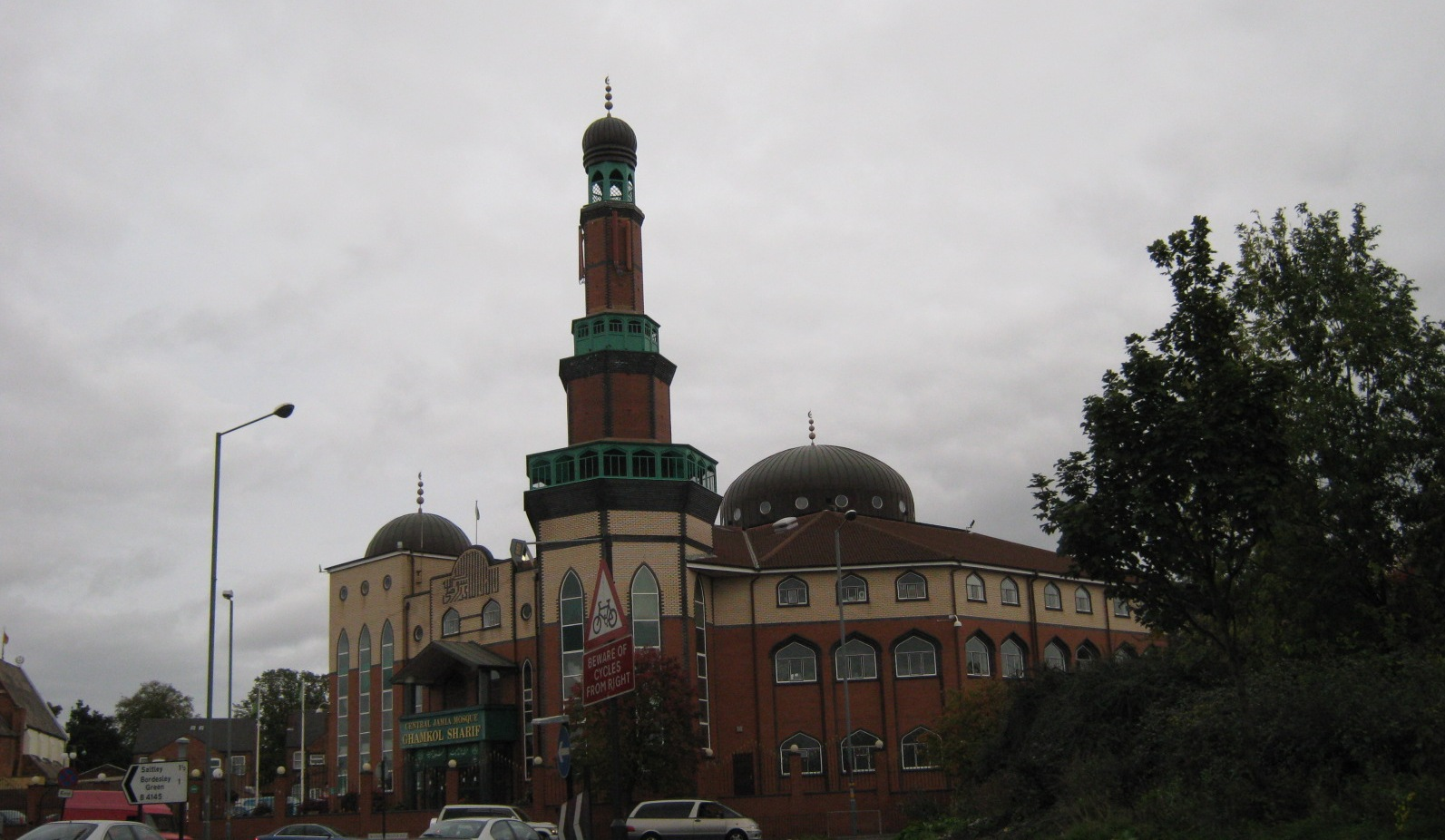

Religion
- Affiliation: Sunni Islam

Location
- Location: Small Heath, Birmingham, England
- Interactive map of Central Jamia Mosque Ghamkol Sharif

Architecture
- Groundbreaking: 15 March 1992
- Completed: 1996

Specifications
- Capacity: 6,000 (including women)
- Dome: 2
- Minaret: 1

Website
- ghamkolsharif.org

Central Jamia Mosque Ghamkol Sharif is a Sunni mosque in the Small Heath area of Birmingham, England.

The website Muslims in Britain classifies the Ghamkol Shariff Masjid as Sufi – Barelvi.

Construction began on 15 March 1992, during Ramadan. Each night throughout its construction, a number of hafiz recited the Quran on the construction site. Building work ended in 1996. It can fit up to 6,000 people at one time.

The Masjid is named after a Sufi saint's place of residence, Ghamkol Sharif near Kohat, in northern Pakistan. Sufi saint Zinda Peer Sahib has followers in several countries, especially in the UK.

== See also ==
- Birmingham Central Mosque
- Islam in the United Kingdom
- Islamic schools and branches
- Islamism
- List of mosques in the United Kingdom
