= Stephen Duffy =

English musician, singer and songwriter (born 1960)

- Also known as: Tin Tin; Duffy
- Born: Stephen Anthony James Duffy; 30 May 1960 (age 66); Alum Rock, Birmingham, Warwickshire, England
- Occupations: Musician, singer, songwriter
- Instruments: Vocals; guitar; bass; drums; keyboards
- Years active: 1978–present
- Labels: Virgin Records; Sire/Warner Bros. Records
- Member of: The Lilac Time
- Formerly of: Duran Duran, The Devils, The Hawks, Tin Tin, Dr. Calculus, Me Me Me

Stephen Anthony James Duffy aka Stephen 'Tin Tin' Duffy, and Stephen 'A J' Duffy (born 30 May 1960) is an English musician, singer and songwriter. He was a founding member, vocalist and bassist of Duran Duran in 1978–79. He went on to record as a solo performer under several different names, and is the singer and songwriter for The Lilac Time with his elder brother Nick. He has also co-written with Robbie Williams and Steven Page.

== Career ==
=== Duran Duran and other early work ===
While attending the School of Foundation Studies & Experimental Workshop at Birmingham Polytechnic (now Birmingham City University), Duffy met John Taylor. Together, along with Taylor's childhood friend Nick Rhodes, they formed the group Duran Duran. While Taylor was the guitarist (later switching to bass) and Rhodes played the synthesizer, Duffy was the band's vocalist/lyricist and bassist. When bass player Simon Colley joined, Duffy moved to drums. He left both the school and the band in 1979, before Duran Duran signed with EMI in 1980.

He went on to form Obviously Five Believers, sometimes known as The Subterranean Hawks or The Hawks, and he made his first four-track recordings. The Hawks' only single, "Words of Hope", was released in 1981.

=== Tin Tin ===
In 1982, he created the band Tin Tin, with John Mulligan and Dik Davis (both then of Fashion), Andy "Stoker" Growcott (of Dexys Midnight Runners) and Bob Lamb (original producer of Birmingham band UB40). Originally called Holy Tin Tin before being shortened, the band were signed with WEA Records in the UK, and released the single "Kiss Me" in 1982, but this was unsuccessful. By 1983, Tin Tin had signed with Sire Records in the US, and "Kiss Me" hit the dance charts there. Another single, "Hold It", was also released in 1983, and peaked at no. 55 in the UK.

After a stint of working in the US, Duffy returned to England and signed a deal as a solo artist with Virgin 10. Now working under the name Stephen "Tin Tin" Duffy, he recorded a new version of "Kiss Me" which was released in 1984, this time only in the local West Midlands area, followed by a nationwide release of "She Makes Me Quiver" which peaked at no. 88 in September 1984. At the end of 1984, Duffy recorded a third version of "Kiss Me", produced by J.J. Jeczalik and Nicholas Froome, which was released in February 1985. It debuted at no. 22 and peaked at no. 4 in the UK and stayed in the Top 10 for five weeks. Duffy followed it with the single "Icing on the Cake", which peaked at no. 14 in June 1985.

Duffy's first full album, The Ups and Downs (produced by Duffy, Froome, Jeczalik, Booker T. Jones, and Stephen Street), reached number 35 in the UK. Prior to the release of The Ups And Downs, Stephen Duffy and his brother Nick formed their own design office called "DUFFY and DUFFY". For the album's preview release, they had an exhibition of about 80 paintings, drawings, photographs, and video.

A new single, "Unkiss That Kiss", was released in September 1985 and peaked at no. 77 in the UK. For this single, Duffy had become known as Stephen A.J. Duffy after dropping the "Tin Tin" reference from his stage name. The single was the first to be taken from the album Because We Love You, released in early 1986, for which he was credited simply as Stephen Duffy. Additional singles from the album were "I Love You" (which peaked at no. 86) and "Something Special" which was a collaboration with Sandii (of Sandii & the Sunsetz); however, this single (and the album itself) failed to chart.

=== Dr. Calculus ===
Duffy also recorded a non-stop forty-minute early chill-out / house album in 1986 called Designer Beatnik with Roger Freeman of Pigbag, released under the name Dr. Calculus mdma. The cover photo shows the "Spirit of Ecstasy" Rolls-Royce car mascot and the album's two singles were "Programme 7" and "Perfume from Spain".

=== The Lilac Time ===
In 1986, Duffy began writing and recording music that would become The Lilac Time's first album, released on Swordfish Records. The album, entitled The Lilac Time, came out in November 1987, and was subsequently reissued in remixed form by Fontana on 8 February 1988.

The Lilac Time have gone through various line-up changes with the Duffy brothers as mainstays. The group originally consisted of Stephen Duffy, his elder brother Nick Duffy, and friend Michael Weston, who recorded the first album together; Michael Giri and Fraser Kent joined when the band was ready to go on tour. The Lilac Time put out the albums Paradise Circus in 1989 and & Love For All in 1990 for Fontana before being dropped.

The group were then briefly signed to Creation Records, and were subsequently managed by label head, Alan McGee. Their sole release on Creation was Astronauts in 1991.

In 1991, the band split up (temporarily, as it turned out) and Duffy subsequently pursued a solo career.

=== Solo ===
The 1993 Stephen Duffy album Music in Colors (Parlophone) was recorded with Nigel Kennedy, and featured the singles "Natalie" and "Holte End Hotel".

The next album was called simply Duffy, released in August 1995 on Indolent Records. "London Girls" and "Sugar High" went to the top 10 on the UK indie chart. ("Starfit" was also released as a single in the US.) The album was reissued on CD in 2000 by BMG Fun House.

He participated in a temporary supergroup called Me Me Me, consisting of Duffy, Alex James of Blur, Justin Welch of Elastica, and Charlie Bloor. The one-off single, "Hanging Around", was released 5 August 1996, and reached Number 19 on the UK chart.

I Love My Friends was released in 1998 by Cooking Vinyl Records, who also released the singles "17" and "You Are".

Virgin released a compilation album entitled They Called Him Tin Tin in 1999.

=== The Devils ===
In 1999, Duffy found a tape recording of 1978–1979 Duran Duran music that was in storage. Shortly afterwards, he had a chance meeting with Nick Rhodes. Reminiscences led to a desire to collaborate, and they ended up re-recording the music on the tape. They did not change any of the lyrics, and used only late-70s-era instrumentation with modern recording techniques. The result was the album Dark Circles, released under the name The Devils.

=== Return to The Lilac Time ===
Duffy reformed The Lilac Time with brother Nick and Michael Giri, along with new members Claire Worrall and Melvin Duffy (no relation). They released Looking for a Day in the Night in 1999 on spinART Records, and lilac6 on Cooking Vinyl in 2001. Compendium – The Fontana Trinity, a collection of tracks from their singles and first three albums was also released in 2001.

The album Keep Going was released in 2003 on Folk Modern records under the name 'Stephen Duffy & The Lilac Time'.

In 2007, Duffy released a new album and limited edition (2000 copies) book called Runout Groove and held a few rare performances with the full Lilac Time ensemble, notably headlining the Green Man Festival.

=== Work with Robbie Williams and Steven Page ===
In the 1990s, Duffy co-wrote several songs with Steven Page of Barenaked Ladies, including the hits "Jane", "Alcohol", and "Call and Answer". The two also cowrote most of the tracks on Page's The Vanity Project (2005).

Duffy co-wrote the Robbie Williams single "Radio", one of two new tracks recorded for Williams's Greatest Hits album, and a number one in the UK charts in October 2004.

In October 2005, Robbie Williams released Intensive Care, co-written and co-produced by Stephen Duffy. The album sold over eight million copies, becoming Williams' best selling studio album around the world. Duffy then went on to work as the musical director for Williams' Close Encounters World Tour.

=== Film documentary ===
The Douglas Arrowsmith documentary Memory & Desire: 30 Years in the Wilderness with Stephen Duffy & the Lilac Time was filmed over six years and includes vintage footage of the band. The film was released at the London Raindance Film Festival in October 2009, accompanied by a Universal Records album of the same name, bringing together songs from Duffy's thirty years of music making. It was not picked up for general distribution however and was withdrawn to be re-edited to include live footage. As of 2022, it is no longer titled Memory & Desire and it is described as an ongoing project.

Duffy sat for sculptor Jon Edgar in London in 2008. The terracotta work was coincidentally documented during the filming of the Douglas Arrowsmith documentary Memory and Desire. An image appears on the CD cover for the Memory and Desire (2009) album.

=== Later work ===
In 2021, an album by The Hawks called Obviously 5 Believers arrived more than 40 years after their single "Words Of Hope", with the project overseen by Duffy, drummer Dave Twist and producer John Paterno. The album came about after Duffy got heckled by the band's guitarist Dave Kusworth (also formerly of The Dogs D'Amour and Jacobites) at an event at Birmingham's Glee Club in 2019, with the album being released by Easy Action Records, almost a year after the death of Kusworth.

== Discography ==
=== The Hawks ===
==== Albums ====
- Obviously 5 Believers (2021), Seventeen Records/Easy Action

==== Singles ====
- "Words of Hope"/"Sense of Ending" 7" (1981), Five Believers

=== Tin Tin ===
- "Kiss Me (US Remix)" (October 1982<), WEA
- "Hold It" (July 1983), WEA - UK No. 55

=== Stephen "Tin Tin" Duffy ===
==== Albums ====
- The Ups and Downs (1985), 10 Records - UK No. 35, CAN No. 83
- Because We Love You (1986), 10 Records
- They Called Him Tin Tin (1998), Virgin-VIP

==== Singles ====
- "Kiss Me" (1982), WEA Records
- "She Makes Me Quiver" (1984), 10 Records - UK No. 88
- "Kiss Me" (1985), 10 Records - UK No. 4, AUS No. 16, CAN No. 89
- "Icing on the Cake" (1985), 10 Records - UK No. 14, AUS No. 46
- "Unkiss That Kiss" (1985), 10 Records - UK No. 77
- "I Love You" (1986), 10 Records - UK No. 86
- "Something Special" (1986<), 10 Records (Stephen Duffy & Sandii)
- "I Love You" / "Wednesday Jones" (1986), 10 Records (double-7")
- "Kiss Me" (1989) (re-issue on Old Gold)

=== Albums ===
- Designer Beatnik (1986), 10 Records

=== Singles ===
- "Programme" 7" (1985), 10
- "Perfume from Spain" (1986), 10

=== Stephen Duffy ===
==== Albums ====
- Music in Colors (1993), Parlophone

==== Singles ====
- "Natalie" (1993), Parlophone - UK No. 77

=== Duffy ===
==== Albums ====
- Duffy (1995), Indolent - UK No. 121
- I Love My Friends (1997), Indolent - UK No. 155 / UK Independent Albums No. 16

==== Singles ====
- "London Girls" (1995), Indolent - UK #180
- "Sugar High" (1995), Indolent - UK #83
- "Starfit" (1996), Summershine
- "Needle Mythology" (1996), Indolent - UK #131
- "17" (1997), Indolent
- "17" (1998), Cooking Vinyl
- "You Are" (1998), Cooking Vinyl

=== Me Me Me ===
- "Hanging Around" (1996), Indolent - UK No. 19

=== The Devils ===
- Dark Circles (2002), Tape Modern
