= The Music Lovers (group) =

The Music Lovers were an American pop group based in San Francisco, California.

== History ==
The band was formed in San Francisco in 2003 by English singer-songwriter Matthew Edwards. Between 2003 and 2009 the group released three album and one EP on Le Grand Magistery Records of Detroit. Matthew dissolved the group in 2010. Subsequently Matthew reappeared with Matthew Edwards and the Unfortunates, whose debut album The Fates was released in 2012.

== Members ==
- Matthew "Ted" Edwards (vocals, guitar)
- Jon Brooder (bass, harmonica)
- Paul Comaskey (drums)
- Bryan Cain (guitar, backing vocals)
- Jun Kurihara (vocals, accordion, piano)
- Colin Sherlock (drums)
- Ping Chu (drums)

== Discography ==
- 2003 – ‘Cheap Songs Tell the Truth’ (EP) - Le Grand Magistery/Marriage Records
- 2004 – ‘The Words We Say Before We Sleep’ - Le Grand Magistery/Marriage Records
- 2006 – ‘The Music Lovers Guide for Young People’ – Le Grand Magistery Records (US) Enougho (JA)
- 2009 - 'Masculine Feminine' - Le Grand Magistery Records (US) Sleeping Star (IT)
