= The Ups and Downs (album) =

Studio album by Stephen Duffy
- Released: April 1985
- Studio: The Manor, Shipton-on-Cherwell, Oxfordshire; Fallout Shelter, Hammersmith, London
- Genre: Pop
- Label: 10 Records
- Producer: Stephen Duffy; Booker T. Jones; Stephen Street; J.J. Jeczalik; Nicholas Froome

Stephen Duffy chronology
The Ups and Downs (1985)	Because We Love You (1986)

Professional ratings
Review scores
Source	Rating
AllMusic	4/5 stars

The Ups and Downs is the debut album by the English singer/songwriter Stephen Duffy (released under the name Stephen "Tin Tin" Duffy). It was released in April 1985 and reached No. 35 on the UK Albums Chart.

It includes the UK No. 4 single, "Kiss Me", a solo re-recording of a song originally recorded with his earlier band, Tin Tin. A second single from the album, "The Icing on the Cake" reached #14 in the UK. Although further singles from the album were released, none charted within the top 75.

During a 2008 interview to promote its expanded CD reissue, Duffy commented that "I never liked The Ups and Downs. I enjoyed mixing with Stephen Street and making 'The Icing on the Cake' but the rest of it is just a mess."

== Track listing ==
All tracks composed by Stephen Duffy; except where noted.

No.	Title	Writer(s)	Length
1.	"Kiss Me"		3:54
2.	"She Makes Me Quiver"		3:44
3.	"A Masterpiece"		5:36
4.	"But Is It Art?"	Duffy; Robert "Joad" Gannon	3:48
5.	"Wednesday Jones"		2:12
6.	"Icing on the Cake"		5:12
7.	"The Darkest Blues"		3:21
8.	"Be There"		3:30
9.	"Believe in Me"		4:26
10.	"The World at Large Alone"		3:45

== Personnel ==
- Stephen "Tin Tin" Duffy - vocals
- Guy Pratt, Eluriel "Tinker" Barfield, David Levy - bass
- Andy Richards, Danny Schogger - keyboards
- Charley Charles - drums
- Toni Childs - vocals on "Kiss Me"
- Booker T. Jones - piano on "Wednesday Jones"
- Leroy Williams - percussion on "Icing on the Cake"
- Roger Freeman - trombone
- Chris Dean, Steve Sidwell - brass on "The World at Large Alone"
- Robert "Joad" Gannon, Jane Eugene, Julie Roberts, Gary Osborne - backing vocals
- Nicky Holland - string arrangement
