= The Lilac Time =

English alternative folk-rock band

- Origin: Herefordshire, England
- Genres: Alternative rock; folk rock
- Years active: 1986–present
- Labels: Mercury; Fontana; Creation; Columbia; Cooking Vinyl; Folk Modern; Bogus Frontage; spinART; Tapete
- Members: Stephen Duffy; Nick Duffy; Claire Duffy; Melvin Duffy
- Past members: Michael Weston; Michael Giri; Micky Harris; Adam Cormack; Fraser Kent
- Website: Lilac Time Official Site

The Lilac Time are an English alternative folk-rock band, originally formed in Herefordshire by Stephen Duffy, his brother Nick Duffy and their friend Michael Weston in 1986. The band's name was taken from a line in the Nick Drake song "River Man".

The Lilac Time has gone through various line-up changes, with the Duffy brothers as mainstays. The band's activity has intertwined with Stephen Duffy's solo and songwriting career.

== History ==
The Duffy brothers and Michael Weston recorded music that was first released on Swordfish Records in 1987 and later became the band's self-titled debut. Michael Giri and Fraser Kent joined when the band went on tour. The group signed to Fontana, which reissued the band's first album in remixed form in 1988. The group went on to release the albums Paradise Circus in 1989, and & Love for All in 1990, the latter produced by Andy Partridge and John Leckie.

The Lilac Time was dropped by Fontana then briefly signed to Creation Records, where the band was subsequently managed by label head Alan McGee. The band's sole release on Creation was Astronauts, in 1990. The Duffys' cousin, noted session musician Cara Tivey, contributed organ and piano to the album.

The band later regrouped with Claire Worrall and Melvin Duffy (no relation to the brothers) and recorded Looking For A Day In The Night with producer Stephen Street for spinART Records in 1999. They then released Lilac 6 on Cooking Vinyl in 2001, followed by Keep Going, released in 2003 under the name "Stephen Duffy and the Lilac Time" on Folk Modern.

Runout Groove was released on 22 October 2007 on Bogus Frontage. The band played the 2007 Green Man Festival and the Queen Elizabeth Hall as a six-piece. The band's gig at the Green Man Festival serves as the backdrop to the film "Memory & Desire — 30 Years in the Wilderness With Stephen Duffy & The Lilac Time." The documentary was filmed over six years by Douglas Arrowsmith and included new and vintage Lilac footage. The film is accompanied by a Universal Records album of the same name, which compiles songs from Duffy's thirty years making music. The Queen Elizabeth Hall concert is to be released as a live recording.

No Sad Songs was released on Tapete Records in April 2015.

A new Lilac Time album, Return to Us, was released in October 2019.

The band is now based in Cornwall.

== Discography ==
=== Studio albums ===
- The Lilac Time (1987)
- Paradise Circus (1989)
- & Love for All (1990)
- Astronauts (1991)
- Looking for a Day in the Night (1999)
- lilac6 (2001)
- Keep Going (2003, as Stephen Duffy & The Lilac Time)
- Runout Groove (2007, as Stephen Duffy & The Lilac Time)
- Sapphire Stylus (2009, as Nick Duffy & The Lilac Time)
- No Sad Songs (2015)
- Return to Us (2019)
- Dance Till All the Stars Come Down (2023)

=== Compilation albums ===
- Compendium: The Fontana Trinity (2001)
- Memory & Desire: 30 Years in the Wilderness (2009, as Stephen Duffy & The Lilac Time)

=== Tribute album ===
- One Day One of These Fans Will Change Your Life (2006) – various artists covering Lilac Time songs

=== Singles ===
List of singles, with selected chart positions
Year	Title	Chart positions		Album
Year	Title	UK	US Alt.	Album
1987	"Return to Yesterday / Trumpets from Montparnasse"	—	—	The Lilac Time
1988	"Return to Yesterday"	82	—	The Lilac Time
1988	"You've Got to Love"	79	—	The Lilac Time
1988	"Black Velvet"	99	—	The Lilac Time
1989	"American Eyes"	94	28	Paradise Circus
1989	"Days of the Week"	—	—	Paradise Circus
1989	"The Girl Who Waves at Trains"	—	—	Paradise Circus
1990	"All for Love & Love for All"	77	22	& Love for All
1990	"It'll End in Tears"	—	—	& Love for All
1990	"The Laundry"	—	—	& Love for All
1991	"Madresfield"	—	—	Astronauts
1991	"Dreaming"	—	—	Astronauts
1999	"A Dream That We All Share"	—	—	Looking for a Day in the Night
2001	"This Morning"	—	—	Lilac 6
2007	"Driving Somewhere"	—	—	Runout Groove
2008	Happy Birthday Peace EP	—	—	Runout Groove
2015	"Prussian Blue"	—	—	No Sad Songs
