= Kiss Me (Tin Tin song) =

1982 song by Tin Tin

Single by Tin Tin
- B-side: "Love's Duet"
- Released: 1982
- Recorded: 1982
- Label: WEA/Sire
- Songwriter(s): Stephen Duffy
- Producer(s): Bob Lamb

Tin Tin singles chronology
"Kiss Me" (1982)	"Hold It" (1982)

"Kiss Me" is a song originally released in 1982 by the British band Tin Tin (sometimes written TinTin). The song was allegedly written within 24 hours after the band had signed a record deal with WEA Records. Released as the band's debut single, it failed to chart on the UK Singles Chart. In 1983, it was released on Sire Records in the U.S., where it made the Billboard dance chart. The lead singer and guitarist in Tin Tin, Stephen Duffy, later re-recorded the song twice and released it as a solo single using the name of Stephen "Tin Tin" Duffy. The first re-recording was released as a single only in the West Midlands region in 1984. Another version was recorded in late 1984 and released as a single on 25 February 1985. This version peaked at number 4 in March, selling more than 250,000 copies within three weeks and thus being certified silver.

The chorus is based on a passage from the Biblical book Song of Songs.

It was the last song to be played on BBC Radio 1s MW frequency in 1994, before the station became FM only.

A new version was included on Duffy's compilation album Memory & Desire: 30 Years in the Wilderness, released in 2009 by Universal Records.

== Robbie Williams version ==
"Kiss Me"

Single by Robbie Williams

from the album Rudebox
- Released: 10 October 2006
- Recorded: 2006
- Genre: Dance
- Length: 3:16
- Label: EMI
- Songwriter(s): Stephen Duffy
- Producer(s): Joey Negro

Robbie Williams singles chronology
"Rudebox" (2006)	"Kiss Me" (2006)	"Lovelight" (2006)

"Kiss Me" was later recorded by UK pop singer Robbie Williams for his 2006 album Rudebox. The producer of this version was Joey Negro. On 10 October 2006, Williams' version made its debut at number 13 on the Norwegian combined downloads and singles chart on downloads alone. This version was also once featured as the Free Download of the Week on the American version of iTunes.

== Charts ==
=== Tin Tin 1982–1983 versions ===
The Billboard chart entry is the 1983 Sire release with the François Kevorkian remix, while the UK chart entry is credited to Stephen Duffy using the alias "TinTin", which was released locally in the Midlands without a record label and charted in February 1984.

Chart	Peak position
UK Singles (OCC)	78
US Dance Club Songs (Billboard)	13

=== Stephen "Tin Tin" Duffy 1985 version ===
This is the version produced by Froome & Jeczalik.

Chart	Peak position
Australia (Kent Music Report)	16
Belgium (Ultratop 50)	15
Germany (GfK)	26
Netherlands (Single Top 100)	18
UK Singles Chart	4

=== Robbie Williams version ===
Chart (2006)	Peak position
Norway (VG-lista)	13
Sweden (Sverigetopplistan)	56
