= Nick Duffy =

British artist

- Also known as: Eagle Ombina
- Born: Nicholas John Duffy; 24 June 1956 (age 69); Birmingham, England
- Occupations: Musician, artist, illustrator, filmmaker
- Instruments: Banjo, violin, accordion, ukulele
- Label: Bogus Frontage
- Website: Nick Duffy's Official Site

Nicholas John Duffy (born on 24 June 1956) is an English musician, artist, illustrator, and filmmaker.

Nick is the elder brother of singer/songwriter Stephen Duffy. They are both co-founders of the folk-pop group The Lilac Time. Nick is a multi-instrumentalist, and has been a frequent contributor to Stephen's solo recordings. He also plays in other musical projects and has released solo recordings.

== Artistic career ==
In addition to making music, Nick has long worked as an illustrator and has pursued a variety of artistic endeavors. Before Stephen released his first album The Ups And Downs in 1985, the brothers formed their own design office called "DUFFY and DUFFY". For the album's preview release, they had an exhibition of about 80 paintings, drawings, photographs, and video. Duffy studied art at Birmingham Polytechnic (now Birmingham City University) and Portsmouth Polytechnic (now University of Portsmouth).

== The Lilac Time ==
In 1986, Nick and Stephen formed The Lilac Time along with his friend, Michael Weston. Since their formation, the Lilac Time have gone through various line-up changes with the Duffy brothers as mainstays. In the band, Nick plays banjo, violin and accordion among other instruments. He also contributes songwriting and has done production work on their recordings. The band's sporadic activity and recording output have intertwined with Stephen's solo and songwriting career.

Nick is featured in The Lilac Time documentary film "Memory & Desire" by Douglas Arrowsmith which was slated to be released in 2009.

== Other musical projects ==
In 1989, Nick formed Bait after The Lilac Time's idea for a double album was rejected by their label Fontana. The Lilac Time ended up making Paradise Circus and the remaining material was released under "Bait." In the 1990s, Nick had made a solo recording, Original Super Mango, under the name "Eagle Ombina." He later formed Zsa Zsa Zsa, who released a self-titled EP. Nick's album Sapphire Stylus was released in December 2009 on Bogus Frontage. In 2016 he formed alt-folk duo We Are Muffy, with singer, songwriter & multi-instrumentalist Angeline Morrison. Their debut album 'The Charcoal Pool' was released in 2018 on Tapete Records. Each song on the album details a memory of growing up in Birmingham. Uncut Magazine awarded the album 8 stars, writing that 'They summon the dust, stillness and daydreams of Sunday afternoons in 1972'.

== Personal life ==
He lives with his family in Cornwall.
