= Lewis Taylor (disambiguation) =

Lewis Taylor is a British musician.

Lewis Taylor may also refer to

- Lewis Taylor (album), album by Lewis Taylor
- Lewis Taylor (rugby league), rugby league footballer
- Lewis Taylor (Australian footballer) (born 1995), Australian rules football player for the Sydney Swans
