= Rhythm Killers =

Studio album by Sly and Robbie
- Released: May 1987
- Recorded: 1987
- Studio: Quad Recording (New York)
- Genre: Funk; dance
- Length: 35:32
- Label: Island
- Producer: Bill Laswell, Material

Sly and Robbie chronology
Language Barrier (1985)	Rhythm Killers (1987)	The Summit (1988)

Singles from Rhythm Killers
- 1. "Boops (Here to Go)" Released: 1987; 2. "Fire" Released: 1987

Rhythm Killers is an album by Jamaican musical duo Sly and Robbie, released in May 1987 by Island Records. By the time of the album's recording, Sly and Robbie had transitioned away from their prolific work in the reggae genre. They spent the 1980s experimenting with electronic sounds and contemporary recording technology on international, cross-genre endeavors, which influenced their direction for Rhythm Killers.

Sly and Robbie enlisted producer Bill Laswell and an ensemble of musicians to record the album at the Quad studio in New York City. Along with their live instruments, the duo used electronic recording equipment such as the Fairlight CMI synthesizer and electronic drums. The predominantly funk and dance-oriented album is arranged into two side-long gapless suites of songs. Other styles featured on the record include hip hop, hard rock, worldbeat, and downtown music. Laswell's densely layered production incorporated electronic grooves, hard beats, string synthesizers, and cross-rhythms produced by turntable scratches, African and Latin-influenced percussion, and percussive raps.

Rhythm Killers charted in four countries, including the United Kingdom, where it peaked at number 35. It was promoted with two singles, including the UK hit "Boops (Here to Go)". The album received positive reviews from critics and was ranked in year-end lists by NME magazine and Village Voice critic Robert Christgau, who named it the seventh best record of 1987. Encouraged by its success, Sly and Robbie continued their digital direction on subsequent albums. Rhythm Killers has since been out of print.

== Background ==
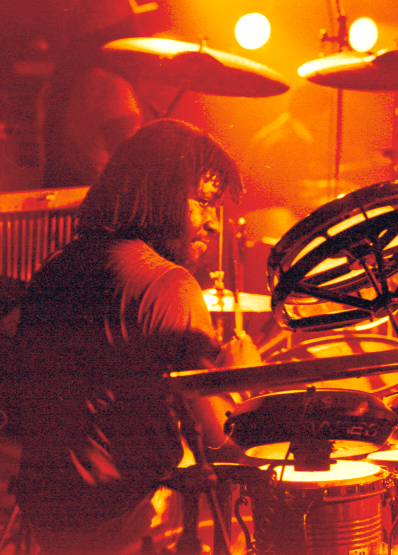
Sly Dunbar (pictured in 1979) became interested in newer recording technology such as electronic drums.

Amid their prolific reggae output as sessions musicians, solo artists, and production duo, Sly and Robbie—drummer Sly Dunbar and bassist Robbie Shakespeare—opened their own record label Taxi Records and attained a distribution deal with Island Records during the early 1980s. After Island founder and executive Chris Blackwell hired them to work with singer Grace Jones, the duo developed a more sparse, robotic production style with funk and dub influences. This deviated from their past reggae work, as well as the genre's roots sound and light rhythms. Sly and Robbie recorded primarily at Blackwell's Compass Point Studios in the Bahamas with state-of-the-art equipment, which led to Dunbar's experimentation with electronic drums and drum machines.

After their work with Black Uhuru and that group's line-up change, Sly and Robbie pursued more international music endeavors. They branched out into cross-genre experiments with a conceptual, ensemble-oriented approach, while developing a mentorship with record producer Bill Laswell, whom they met through Blackwell and by working on Mick Jagger's 1985 album She's the Boss. In 1985, they collaborated with Laswell on their album Language Barrier, which had guest contributions from Herbie Hancock, Bob Dylan, Afrika Bambaataa, and Manu DiBango. Its recording developed from a track the duo had revisited from their work on the soundtrack to the 1983 film Never Say Never Again. The track had been done with electronic drums at Compass Point Studios, but scrapped as a rhythm track for later use.

A dub album, Language Barrier showcased a musical clash between the duo's characteristic rhythms and Laswell's own production style, with African jazz influences, predominant use of the Fairlight CMI sampling synthesizer, and experimentations with tempo and dub techniques. Dunbar was enthused by newer recording technology and, in a 1987 interview for The Sydney Morning Herald, said that he wanted to "be a part of it, not be left out." Although it had a lukewarm reception from music critics, Language Barrier was Sly and Robbie's first work to receive international exposure. For their next album, they sought to record a like-minded album to expand their audience.

== Recording and production ==
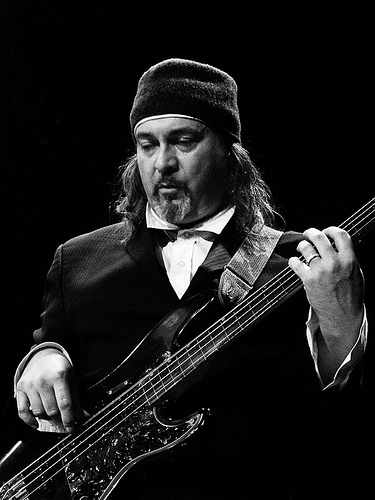
Bill Laswell (2006) densely layered Sly and Robbie's songs in his production of the album.

After releasing The Sting (1986) and Electro Reggae (1987) as members of their Taxi Gang band, Sly and Robbie enlisted Laswell again to work on Rhythm Killers. They recorded the album over a period of three months at Quad Recording in New York City. Before entering the studio, Sly and Robbie originally had planned music and demos to work with, but scrapped them after Chris Blackwell of Island discouraged the idea. Blackwell wanted the duo to come up with original material at the studio, as they had been known to do since their early years in Jamaica.

In an effort to crossover with music listeners outside of reggae's market, Sly and Robbie heightened their experimentation with other musical sounds, particularly funk and occasional hip hop music. Despite his eclectic output, Laswell himself had started out as a bass player in funk groups, an experience that inspired him to compose his musical arrangements with a rhythmic foundation. Dunbar explained their approach for the album in an interview for Musician at the time, saying that "We're trying to get new fans. Once they come into the funk, they're going to have to come into the reggae, because that's where we're going to take them." Sly and Robbie's direction was also influenced by the supervision of Blackwell who, according to Dunbar, "wanted us to make two tracks, 17 minutes long. So we cut two tracks and extended them, each side consisting of three songs. Non-stop dancing, that's the idea."

In the early stage of recording, Sly and Robbie focused primarily on constructing difficult grooves for songs. To record their rhythm tracks, Dunbar worked in the studio alone and cut a drum part without having a melody in mind. He recounted his approach for the album to Musician, saying that "I just played what I felt, working from a sense of 'now I'll do 103 beats per minute.' And Robbie would come in the next night and lay a bass part." Unlike most reggae or funk bassists, Shakespeare approached his playing as a jazz soloist and attempted numerous subtle variations to his riff. He said that his inspiration "comes from God. Sometimes endless ideas just keep coming to me. Sometimes I'll change the drum pattern to a bass line and Sly will play the bass line on the drums." Along with live percussion, Dunbar played Simmons drums, and the duo integrated contemporary electronic music technology such as the Fairlight CMI synthesizer in the album's recording. Dunbar used his recorded live drums to trigger the synthesizer's sampled drum sounds.

Sly and Robbie worked with an ensemble of musicians, including funk artists Bootsy Collins, Bernie Worrell, and Gary "Mudbone" Cooper, reggae vocalist Shinehead, avant-garde jazz musicians Karl Berger and Henry Threadgill, hip hop artist Rammellzee, turntablist D.S.T., and guitarist Nicky Skopelitis. Rhythm Killers was produced by Laswell with his band Material, which included Shakespeare, vocalist Bernard Fowler, and percussionist Aïyb Dieng, among others. Sly and Robbie recorded songs in single takes and cut approximately 20 tracks a day with Laswell and engineer Robert Musso, who used reel-to-reel tape recording. Laswell also hired violinist Mark Feldman, who was working at a dinner theater in Connecticut at the time. He had Feldman read charts in the strings section and play syncopated lines, which he found "a little more funky" than the theater. The album was mixed at The Power Station and mastered by Howie Weinberg at Masterdisk in New York City.

== Music and lyrics ==
This is a record about contact points, less about the styles it serves up than about the unpredictable conflicts and agreements that arise at their intersection. By incessantly overlapping the fragments in the mix, Laswell sustains a constant state of juxtaposition. The music never defines itself statically; it's always just evolved out of something and on its way to evolving into something else.

— John Leland (Spin, 1987)

Rhythm Killers is characterized as a work of funk music by Musician magazine's Alan di Perna, while Stereo Review critic Phyl Garland called it a dance album. The album's songs feature contrasting musical elements. Writer and musicologist Robert Palmer viewed it as an attempt at "an ambitious dance-music synthesis, with funk the stylistic common denominator", adding that the "funk ethos – less is more, the groove is the tune – underlies all of Mr. Laswell's work". Although it is not a reggae album, Rhythm Killers exhibits Sly and Robbie's Taxi Records production aesthetic, which drew on their cultural connection to Jamaican dance halls and their collective interest in experimental electronic sounds. Dunbar was particularly fascinated with the Syndrum instrument, and Rhythm Killers is one of the last albums to feature live drums by him. Incorporating mechanized beats, rocksteady tempos, and sinuous bass, the aesthetic presaged ragga music and the rise of digital instrumentation in reggae during the 1980s. Similar to Language Barrier, Rhythm Killers has a dense, thudding sound and heavy-handed, humorless tone, but features more recognizable hooks.

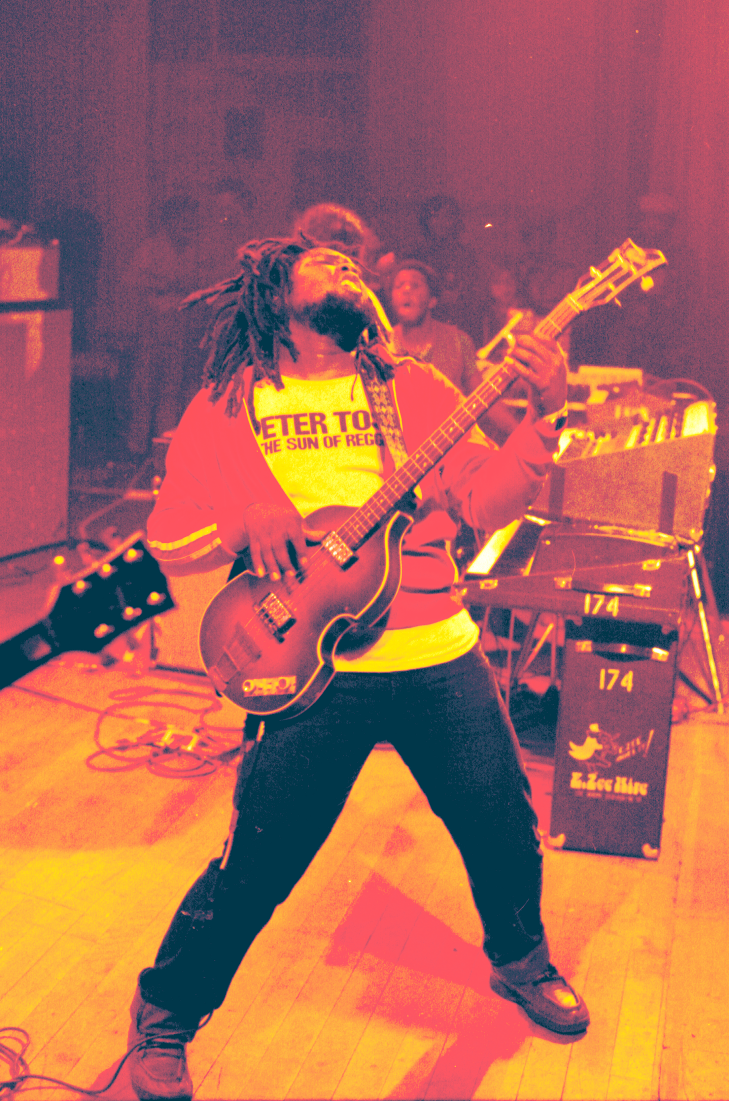
Robbie Shakespeare, the duo's bassist, in 1978

The songs on Rhythm Killers are typified by deep bass, striking beats, low-frequency grooves, improvisational rhythms, electronic percussion, disco-era string synthesizers, aggressive guitar riffs, and stylistic influences from reggae, early hip hop, downtown music, hard rock, and worldbeat genres. They are densely layered in a fashion similar to Phil Spector's Wall of Sound production. Bud Kliment of Trouser Press said they comprise a groove-oriented "song cycle" that is "heavy-bottomed from start to finish". Similar to the album's funk instrumentation, the guest rappers have exclamatory, confrontational tones and percussive vocals. The vocals are complemented by improvisatory turntable scratches and both African- and Latin-influenced percussion, which resulted in cross-rhythms during the songs. Carl Matthews of the Baltimore Afro-American observed "a noticeable looseness in the vocals and a sort of P-Funk quality to the rhythm tracks." Mat Smith from Melody Maker said the enthusiastic music was driven by a "schizophrenic art of noise attack all lashed around a nonstop rhythm that bumps each track nose to tail tight."

According to the Spin Alternative Record Guide (1995), Rhythm Killers "truly broke ground" after the experimentation on Language Barrier and served as "the story of late-20th-century black music done as symphony." Music journalist Peter Shapiro noticed "a striking collision of urban sounds" in the album's music, while Robert Hilburn called it an "unpredictable salute to the liveliness and character of urban pop music in its broadest sense." Mike Joyce of The Washington Post found it "more punchy and elastic" than Language Barrier and felt "the accent is still on electronic rhythms, but the mood is vibrantly expansive". Robert Christgau called the album Sly and Robbie's "Laswellized art-funk statement". He characterized the duo as a "world pop" rhythm section and said their style is complemented by "a chauvinistic variation on Bill Laswell's usual international brigade". John Leland argued that the album is "the continuous synthesis that Laswell promised on Herbie Hancock's 'Rockit'", "extended in both length and scope", as it features "a knack for unexpected juxtapositions and no respect for artificial boundaries." According to The Nation, the sounds on the record ranged from Ludwig van Beethoven to Jimi Hendrix.

"Rhythm Killer"
The title track features descending strings and downtown-style saxophone by Henry Threadgill.

The album's songs are arranged into a gapless suite on each side, both of which begin with covers of early 1970s R&B songs. Garland writes that each side is stylistically "derived" from its respective opening track and distinguishes the two side-opening tracks as "anchoring songs [that] serve as starting points for uninterrupted improvisations in rhythm that build to multiple climaxes while drawing from wildly disparate musical styles." "Fire", a cover of the Ohio Players' 1974 song of the same name, was reworked as an extended vamp with an uncredited sample of Liquid Liquid's 1983 song "Cavern", and lyrics proclaiming "bass" to be "the final frontier". It features vocals by Shinehead, whose rap begins with a Howard Cosell impersonation, and Bootsy Collins, who advises listeners that "you have one desire and that's to dance until you drop." "Boop" is a Jamaican Patois slang term for a man who spends money for the benefit of a younger woman. Both "Fire" and "Boops (Here to Go)" touch on popular dancehall topics.

Opening the second side, "Yes, We Can Can" is a cover of the Pointer Sisters 1973 song of the same name, originally written by Allen Toussaint. It eschews the original song's jazz influence for hip hop elements, gritty dub, and Art of Noise-like grooves. Co-written by Shinehead, "Rhythm Killer" features aggressive percussion, frantic toasting by Shinehead, descending strings, and downtown saxophone phrases by Henry Threadgill. It was featured in the 1988 film Colors. The song's groove transitions into "Bank Job", which has a relaxed style, lavish production, and accented electronic rhythms.

== Release and reception ==
Professional ratings
Review scores
Source	Rating
AllMusic	2.5/5 stars
The Encyclopedia of Popular Music	4/5 stars
Los Angeles Times	4/4 stars
Rolling Stone	4/5 stars
The Rolling Stone Album Guide	5/5 stars
Spin Alternative Record Guide	9/10
The Village Voice	A

Rhythm Killers was released by Island Records in May 1987, on CD, LP, and cassette formats. It reached the record charts in the Netherlands, Sweden, and New Zealand, where it reached its highest overall position at number 12 and charted for eight weeks. In the United Kingdom, it spent five weeks on the albums chart, peaking at number 35. It did not chart in the United States. The album's lead single, "Boops (Here to Go)", reached number 22 on the US Billboard Dance Club Play Singles. It was a hit in the UK, where it charted for 11 weeks and reached number 12 on the UK Singles Chart. "Fire", the second single, peaked at number 14 in New Zealand, where it charted for nine weeks. It also peaked at number 60 and charted for four weeks in the UK.

Rhythm Killers was well received by contemporary critics. In a review for The Philadelphia Inquirer, Ken Tucker remarked that having mastered reggae, Sly and Robbie proved they could perform funk music just as well. Steve Hochman from the Los Angeles Times hailed it as one of 1987's best records from any genre because of how Sly and Robbie drew on funk's past 20 years, "from Sly & the Family Stone through George Clinton, along the way throwing in reggae, rap and even a bit of Rossini." In Rolling Stone, Gavin Edwards called it "a thirty-five-minute dance party full of surprises and strange noises", writing that it "sounds like the Great Missing DJ Set—albeit one played by live musicians with perfect telepathy." i-D magazine's Simon Witter said it was the most entertaining and exceptionally conceived dance album of the year, while Garland from Stereo Review called it one of the best dance records in some time because the duo's creative yet accessible urban dance music showed how to combine the best parts of older music with contemporary recording techniques.

In a negative review, Greg Taylor of The Sydney Morning Herald criticized the music as "wallpaper" undermined by a gaudy hip hop production. John Leland of Spin wrote that while Rhythm Killers may be ambitious and successful as a "dialogue on the crosscultural elasticity of the funk", it lacked vigor as actual funk music and never got beyond its concept and "into the funk". In The New York Times, Palmer found the musical ideas innovative and its concept "a worthy one"—that "funk is the Rosetta Stone of contemporary dance music"—but he observed an excess of disordered effects and funk-derived sounds on what were otherwise expressive rhythm tracks.

At the end of 1987, it was named the year's eighth best album by The Face magazine, and 25th best album by NME, who also named "Boops (Here to Go)" the year's 18th best single. Rockdelux ranked Rhythm Killers 11th best, and "Boops (Here to Go)" the sixth best song of 1987. The album also finished 25th in the Pazz & Jop, an annual poll of American critics nationwide, published in The Village Voice. Christgau, the poll's creator and supervisor, named it the seventh best album of the year.

== Legacy and reappraisal ==
Encouraged by the record's success, Sly and Robbie recorded The Summit (1988), an instrumental ragga album with digital riddims that was decried by roots critics, and Silent Assassin (1990), a collaboration with several American rappers. The latter album's fusion of Jamaican dub and American hip hop was a precursor to the rise of dancehall in the US during the early 1990s. Bootsy Collins, who had kept a low profile for much of the 1980s, followed-up his appearance on Rhythm Killers with a comeback album, What's Bootsy Doin'?, in 1988. Shinehead's own appearance on the album bolstered his mainstream exposure as he was receiving American radio airplay with his debut single and performing on an international tour. Rhythm Killers was reissued by Island on 4 June 1990, but eventually went out of print.

In retrospect, culture critic Mark Anthony Neal deems Rhythm Killers an essential album of 1980s underground funk, while reggae historian Steve Barrow cites it as one of the most engaging projects Sly and Robbie were involved in during the 1980s. The State writes that on albums such as Rhythm Killers, they frequently attempted to broaden the role of their instruments and consequently took bass and drums to "unexplored rhythmic frontiers". Mark Coleman, writing in The New Rolling Stone Album Guide (2004), said that the album is "so coherent and smooth that you could mistake it for a suite if it wasn't also so thoroughly down and dirty." In The Rough Guide to Rock (2003), Peter Shapiro cites the album as Laswell's "best outside production" and one that "fulfilled his fusion/fission concept ... in which some of the finest dance musicians in the world jam on two side-long grooves that imply New Orleans R&B, 70s funk, hip-hop and ragga are all part of the same continuum." AllMusic editor Stephen Cook is less enthusiastic and calls it "a valiant venture gone awry", believing that the songs are monotonous and comprising "one tired electronic groove after another". In 2006, "Boops (Here to Go)" featured as a sample on the Robbie Williams song "Rudebox".

== Track listing ==
All tracks were produced by Bill Laswell and Material.

Side one
No.	Title	Writer(s)	Length
1.	"Fire"	William Beck, Leroy Bonner, Marshall Jones, Ralph Middlebrooks, Marvin Pierce, Clarence Satchell, James Williams	5:24
2.	"Boops (Here to Go)"	Edmund Aiken, William Collins, Lowell Dunbar, Bill Laswell, Robert Shakespeare	5:15
3.	"Let's Rock"	Karl Berger, Collins, Dunbar, Laswell, Shakespeare	7:24

Side two
No.	Title	Writer(s)	Length
1.	"Yes, We Can Can"	Allen Toussaint	6:16
2.	"Rhythm Killer"	Aiken, Dunbar, Laswell, Shakespeare	7:17
3.	"Bank Job"	Berger, Collins, Dunbar, Laswell, Rammellzee, Shakespeare	3:55

== Personnel ==
Credits are adapted from the album's liner notes.

- Sly Dunbar – composer, percussion, Simmons drums
- Robbie Shakespeare – bass, composer

=== Vocal ===
- Gary "Mudbone" Cooper – vocals
- Rammellzee – vocals
- Bernard Fowler – vocals
- Shinehead – composer, vocals

=== Additional musicians ===
- Bootsy Collins – composer, guitar, vocals
- Aïyb Dieng – bells, congas, percussion
- D.S.T. – turntable
- Daniel Ponce – batá drum, bells
- Nicky Skopelitis – Fairlight programming, guitar
- Pat Thrall – guitar
- Henry Threadgill – flute, saxophone
- Bernie Worrell – prepared piano
- Karl Berger – composer, conductor, melodica, string arrangements, vibraphone
- Material – producer, string synthesizer
- Pete Sturge - synthesizer, sound fx

=== Additional composers ===
- Billy Beck – composer
- Leroy "Sugarfoot" Bonner – composer
- Marshall Jones – composer
- Ralph "Pee Wee" Middlebrooks – composer
- Marvin "Merv" Pierce – composer
- Clarence "Satch" Satchell – composer
- Allen Toussaint – composer
- James "Diamond" Williams – composer

=== Technical ===
- Bill Laswell – composer, producer
- Robert Musso – engineer
- Steve Boyer – assistant engineer
- Pete Sturge – sampling, editing, engineer
- Jason Corsaro – mixing
- Howie Weinberg – mastering

== Charts ==
Chart (1987)	Peak position
Dutch Albums Chart	75
New Zealand Albums Chart	12
Swedish Albums Chart	44
UK Albums Chart	35

== See also ==
- Island Masters
- List of P-Funk projects

== Bibliography ==
- Barrow, Steve; Dalton, Peter (27 September 2004). The Rough Guide to Reggae (3rd ed.). Rough Guides. ISBN 1843533294.
- Brophy, Philip; et al. (1 June 1990). Hayward, Philip (ed.). Culture, Technology & Creativity in the Late Twentieth Century. Indiana University Press. ISBN 0861962664.
- Coleman, Mark; et al. (2 November 2004). Brackett, Nathan; Hoard, Christian (eds.). The New Rolling Stone Album Guide (4th ed.). Simon & Schuster. ISBN 0743201698.
- DeCurtis, Anthony; Henke, James; George-Warren, Holly, eds. (27 October 1992). The Rolling Stone Album Guide (3rd ed.). Random House. ISBN 0679737294.
- Heatley, Michael; Lester, Paul; Roberts, Chris (27 August 1998). The Encyclopedia of Albums. Dempsey Parr. ISBN 1840840315.
- Larkin, Colin, ed. (1995). The Encyclopedia of Popular Music (2nd ed.). Guinness Publishing. ISBN 1561591769.
- Nash, Jay Robert (1 April 1997). The Motion Picture Guide 1989 Annual: The Films of 1988. Cinebook. ISBN 0933997205.
- Neal, Mark Anthony (16 September 2004). That's the Joint!: The Hip-Hop Reader. Psychology Press. ISBN 0415969190.
- Pilchak, Angela, ed. (26 October 2010). Contemporary Musicians: Profiles of the People in Music. Vol. 55. Thomson Gale. ISBN 978-0787680688.
- Shapiro, Peter; et al. (2003). Buckley, Peter (ed.). The Rough Guide to Rock (2nd ed.). Rough Guides. ISBN 1858284570.
- Strong, Martin C. (1 November 2002). The Great Rock Discography (6th ed.). The National Academies. ISBN 1841953121.
- Thompson, Dave (1 March 2002). Reggae and Caribbean Music. Hal Leonard Corporation. ISBN 0879306556.
- Weisbard, Eric; Marks, Craig, eds. (10 October 1995). Spin Alternative Record Guide. Vintage Books. ISBN 0679755748.
