= The Lost Album (Lewis Taylor album) =

- Original UK cover

Studio album by Lewis Taylor
- Released: 18 October 2004
- Genre: Neo soul, pop rock
- Label: Slow Reality

Lewis Taylor chronology
Limited Edition 2004 (2004)	The Lost Album (2004)	Numb (2022)

Alternative cover
- North American release

Professional ratings
Review scores
Source	Rating
Allmusic	4/5 stars

The Lost Album is the fifth studio album by British neo soul composer and multi-instrumentalist Lewis Taylor, which was released in 2004 with 12 tracks. This was his final album, until the release of Numb in 2022.

Taylor recorded this album in the late 1990s, in reaction to British press naming him "new British blue-eyed soulster". He intended it to be released as a follow-up to his 1996 self-titled debut, but Island Records rejected it, after which he returned with the album Lewis II. The Lost Album was finally released in 2004, through Taylor's own label, Slow Reality.

== Track listing ==
1. Lost (Sabina Smyth) - 1:33
2. Listen Here (Smyth, Taylor) - 4:18
3. Hide Your Heart Away (Taylor) - 4:53
4. Send Me an Angel (Smyth, Taylor) - 4:48
5. The Leader of the Band (Taylor) - 4:29
6. Yeah (Smyth, Taylor) - 4:46
7. Please Help Me If You Can (Taylor) - 4:21
8. Let's Hope Nobody Finds Us (Smyth, Taylor) - 4:43
9. New Morning (Smyth, Taylor) - 5:45
10. Say I Love You (Taylor) - 4:43
11. See My Way (Taylor) - 4:02
12. One More Mystery (Taylor) - 4:49
