= Stoned, Part II =

Studio album by Lewis Taylor
- Released: 1 March 2004
- Genre: Neo soul, pop rock
- Label: Slow Reality

Lewis Taylor chronology
Stoned, Part I (2002)	Stoned, Part II (2004)	Limited Edition 2004 (2004)

Stoned, Part II is the fourth album by British neo-soul composer and multi-instrumentalist Lewis Taylor, released in 2004. It was published by his personal label, Slow Reality.

== Track listing ==
All songs are composed and written by Lewis Taylor.

1. Madman - 4:23
2. Keep Right on - 5:30
3. Reconsider - 3:51
4. When Will I Ever Learn - 3:45
5. Out of My Head Is the Way I Feel - 3:05
6. Carried Away - 3:33
7. Stoned, Pt. 2 - 4:13
8. Positively Beautiful - 4:10
9. Throw Me a Line - 3:43
10. Shame - 3:34
11. Won't Fade Away - 4:06
12. Keep on Keeping on - 4:48

US digital version bonus tracks

1. If I Lay Down With You - 3:14 (originally from the 2002 release Limited Edition)

'Throw Me A Line' is replaced with 'Til the Morning Light' on the US digital version.
