= Close My Eyes =

Close My Eyes can refer to:

- Close My Eyes (film), the 1991 film written and directed by Stephen Poliakoff
- Close My Eyes (album), the 2003 album by The Slackers
- "Close My Eyes (Mariah Carey song), 1997
- "Close My Eyes" (Sander van Doorn song), 2009
- "Close My Eyes" (Luke Hemmings song), 2024
