= Limited Edition 2004 =

Compilation album by Lewis Taylor
- Released: 26 April 2004
- Genres: Neo soul, pop rock
- Label: Slow Reality

Lewis Taylor chronology
Stoned, Part II (2004)	Limited Edition 2004 (2004)	The Lost Album (2004)

Limited Edition 2004 is a compilation album by British Neo soul composer and multi-instrumentalist Lewis Taylor, released in 2004.

== Track listing ==
All tracks written and composed by Lewis Taylor except where noted.

1. Intro - 2:22
2. Back Together - 4:20
3. Consider - 4:23
4. Party (Prog Version) - 7:04
5. No Hope in Here - 6:20
6. Lovelight (West Coast Version) - 5:46
7. Can You Feel It - 4:30
8. I Don't Care This Time Around - 4:53
9. Morning Light (Prog Version) - 5:50
10. Keep Right On (Pop Version) - 4:33

UK digital version bonus tracks

1. Throw Me A Line 2 - 4:07
2. Lucky (Acoustic Version) - 4:59
3. Track (Acoustic Version) - 4:12
4. Song (Acoustic Version) - 2:25
5. If I Lay Down With You (Acoustic Version) - 3:15
6. Ghosts (David Sylvian) - 3:51

US digital version bonus tracks

1. Carried Away 2 - 4:10
2. From the Day We Met, Pt. 2 - 4:44 (originally from the 2002 release Stoned, Part I)
3. Throw Me A Line 2 - 4:07
4. Send Me an Angel 2 - 4:46 (originally from the 2004 release The Lost Album)

"Back Together" is replaced with "Back Together 2" on the US digital version.
