= Rudebox =

Studio album by Robbie Williams
- Released: 23 October 2006
- Recorded: November 2005 – August 2006
- Genre: Dance
- Length: 74:44
- Label: Chrysalis
- Producers: Soul Mekanik; Mark Ronson; Pet Shop Boys; Brandon Christy & Craig Russo; William Orbit; Joey Negro; Jerry Meehan

Robbie Williams chronology
Intensive Care (2005)	Rudebox (2006)	Reality Killed the Video Star (2009)

Singles from Rudebox
- 1. "Rudebox" Released: 4 September 2006; 2. "Kiss Me" Released: 10 October 2006; 3. "Lovelight" Released: 13 November 2006; 4. "Bongo Bong and Je ne t'aime plus" Released: 22 January 2007; 5. "She's Madonna" Released: 5 March 2007

Rudebox is the seventh studio album by the English singer Robbie Williams, released by Chrysalis Records on 23 October 2006 in the United Kingdom. A breakaway from previous releases, Williams worked with a variety of producers, including Mark Ronson, Soul Mekanik, Pet Shop Boys, William Orbit, Joey Negro, and Jerry Meehan. It also features two guest appearances from the Pet Shop Boys. Rudebox is a dance album with pop, disco, electronica and rap elements.

Rudebox received mixed reviews, but reached number one in 14 countries, including United Kingdom, Australia, Switzerland, Germany, Mexico, Argentina, Spain, Italy and Finland. It was supported by five singles: "Rudebox", "Kiss Me", "Lovelight", "Bongo Bong and Je ne t'aime plus" and "She's Madonna". "Rudebox" reached number one in Germany, Switzerland and Italy, and the top ten in several countries. "Lovelight" was a top ten hit in six countries, including the UK, where it reached number 8.

== Background ==
The album is a mixture of covers and new tracks, in addition to "Summertime", a song originally written when Williams left Take That and which appeared in the credits of Mike Bassett: England Manager, and features collaborations with William Orbit, Mark Ronson, Soul Mekanik (featuring Candy Flip's Danny Spencer and his brother) and two collaborations with Pet Shop Boys: "She's Madonna" and "We're the Pet Shop Boys". the songs Williams covers five songs on the album: "Louise", a 1984 hit for The Human League, "Kiss Me", the biggest hit for Stephen Duffy, "Lovelight" by Lewis Taylor, "We're the Pet Shop Boys" by My Robot Friend, and "Bongo Bong and Je ne t'aime plus", by Manu Chao.

Williams himself spoke fondly of the album upon its release; "It has become something on which I've found myself. This is the right direction for me personally, this is what it is. I saw the whole Robbie thing coming to a close as it was, I couldn't make another album like the ones I'd made, and this has just opened up a thousand other doors. What I am excited about now is making more music. I love all the stuff on the album, I love Rudebox, it's a favourite song of mine. I don't know what's gonna happen now, I'm excited about getting it out there, but I'm more excited about making more."

Williams subsequently worked with co-producer Mark Ronson again the following year on his covers album Version, contributing vocals to his cover of The Charlatans' 1990 hit "The Only One I Know". The Apple Music description of Version dubs Ronson and Williams' rendition as having "transformed a baggy anthem into a Northern soul stomper". The cover was also featured on select editions of Williams' 2010 greatest hits album In and Out of Consciousness: Greatest Hits 1990–2010.

== Controversies ==
"She's Madonna" was at the centre of a tabloid storm after Ashley Hamilton claimed that he came up with part of the song with Williams. Hamilton has claimed he wishes to take the matter to court as he is not credited as a co-writer on the album.

Further controversy arose over the track "The 90's", part of which implies that Williams was ripped off by Take That's manager Nigel Martin-Smith after the band failed to make a profit from a European tour. The song raised the ire of Martin-Smith, who demanded that the song be removed from the album. The omitted lyrics were rapped during the break before the second verse. During a 2019 concert at The Roundhouse in London, Williams stated: "Somebody asked me to do The '90s tonight. But I can't [...] because I'll get sued by Nigel Martin-Smith".

== Critical reception ==
Professional ratings
Aggregate scores
Source	Rating
Metacritic	53/100
Review scores
Source	Rating
AllMusic	4/5 stars
The Guardian	2/5 stars
The Independent	3/5 stars
Mojo	4/5 stars
musicOMH	2/5 stars
NME	8/10
Now	3/5 stars
The Observer	2/5 stars
PopMatters	7/10
Uncut	3/5 stars

According to review aggregator Metacritic, Rudebox received an average of 53 out of 100 indicating "mixed or average reviews", based on reviews from 12 critics.

Rating the album 8 out of 10, Priya Elan of NME wrote "Luckily, Rudebox is the best thing he's ever put his name to," adding that "there's the double-headed autobiography of 'The 80's' (currently at the centre of a legal dispute) and its follow-up 'The 90's', the clattering 'Vogue' rap in the LA tale 'The Actor' and 'She’s Madonna' – possibly his most bonkers song ever". Julie Broadfoot of BBC Music wrote: "There are a couple of tracks that wash over you but the album's a grower and some of the hooks will follow you around for hours," adding that "Good Doctor," a "tongue-in-cheek take on drugs, has bags of energy and the Stephen Duffy "Kiss Me" is brilliant. "She's Madonna" ("I love you baby, but face it she's Madonna") is a weird but fun tune about Queen Madge."

Michael Hubbard, writing for musicOMH, found that Rudebox "ultimately is, as a whole, several decent records whinnying to escape from development too early, resulting only in an expensive-sounding missed opportunity". Paul Flynn from The Observer wrote that "the hastily conceived Rudebox is bookmarked mostly by a ragbag of weary cover versions that even an advanced pop historian would have trouble connecting." In his review for The Guardian, Alexis Petridis noted: "A scant handful of highlights aside, it is packed with half-baked ideas, bad jokes, music that any other star of Williams' stature would be terrified of the general public hearing. Perhaps that's the point. If nothing else, Rudebox is a sharp reminder that Robbie Williams is unique."

== Commercial performance ==
In the United Kingdom, the album sold 54,667 copies on the day of its release, reaching number one on the midweek version of the UK Albums Chart. The next day, the album had sold over 75,000 copies. The album debuted at No. 1 on the UK Albums Chart, selling over 147,000 copies in its week of release. Despite reaching number one, sales were far below what was expected by his label EMI and overall sales were overtaken by his former band Take That's Beautiful World. However, the album performed better than Beautiful World outside the UK. The fallout of the album's relative failure led to the firing of two music executives responsible for the album's development. As of December 2013, the album had sold 514,457 copies in the UK. In 2008, NME reported that over one million unsold copies of the album were being sold to a company in China to be recycled and used as a road paving material.

The album was released in the Netherlands on 20 October 2006, on the same day the album was certified platinum as a result of pre-order sales of over 70,000 copies. In Belgium, the album sold 50,000 copies and went platinum. It was released on 23 October 2006 in Australia and debuted at number-one, achieving platinum status in its first week. It has since been certified 2× Platinum. 220,000 copies of the album were sold in France on the week of release, as well as 600,000 in Germany. On 8 November 2006, IFPI certified the album 2× Platinum in Europe with sales of over 2 million copies, making it the fastest platinum selling album of 2006. On 20 November 2006, the album reached number-one in Mexico, becoming Williams' first number-one album there. The album was certified platinum there, with sales of over 100,000 copies.

== Sequel ==
In December 2020, while promoting "Can't Stop Christmas," the second single from his twelfth studio album The Christmas Present (2019), Williams revealed to the Official Charts Company that he had recorded a dance album during the lockdown period, which includes collaborations with Guy Chambers and a number of dance music artists from Stoke-on-Trent. The untitled album was scheduled to be released in spring 2021, and might be released with the band name Stoke House Mafia (a name inspired by 2010s chart stars Swedish House Mafia), though the report from the Official Charts Company did not confirm whether the record was the Rudebox sequel or not.

== Track listing ==
Rudebox track listing
No.	Title	Writer(s)	Producer(s)	Length
1.	"Rudebox"	Robbie Williams; Kelvin Andrews; Danny Spencer; Bill Laswell; Carl Aiken; William Collins; Sly Dunbar; Robbie Shakespeare	Soul Mekanik	4:45
2.	"Viva Life on Mars"	Williams; Andrews; Spencer	Soul Mekanik	4:50
3.	"Lovelight"	Lewis Taylor	Mark Ronson	4:02
4.	"Bongo Bong and Je ne t'aime plus"	Manu Chao; Anouk Khelifa	Ronson	4:48
5.	"She's Madonna" (with Pet Shop Boys)	Williams; Neil Tennant; Chris Lowe	Pet Shop Boys	4:16
6.	"Keep On"	Williams; Chris Heath; S. Duffy	Ronson	4:18
7.	"Good Doctor"	Williams; Jerry Meehan	Ronson	3:16
8.	"The Actor"	Williams; Brandon Christy; Craig Russo	Christy; Russo	4:06
9.	"Never Touch That Switch"	Andrews; Spencer	Soul Mekanik	2:46
10.	"Louise"	Jo Callis; Phil Oakey; Adrian Wright	William Orbit	4:46
11.	"We're the Pet Shop Boys" (with Pet Shop Boys)	My Robot Friend	Chris Zippel; Pet Shop Boys	4:56
12.	"Burslem Normals"	Williams; Andrews; Spencer	Soul Mekanik	3:50
13.	"Kiss Me"	Duffy	Dave Lee	3:16
14.	"The 80's"	Williams; Meehan	Meehan	4:17
15.	"The 90's"	Williams; Meehan	Meehan	5:33
16.	"Summertime"	Williams; Antony Genn	Orbit	10:51
Total length:				74:44

Notes

- "Rudebox" contains elements of the composition "Boops (Here to Go)" as written by Bill Laswell, Carl Aiken, Bootsy Collins, Sly Dunbar and Robbie Shakespeare.
- Summertime contains hidden track "Dickhead" on minute 6:42

== Charts ==
=== Weekly charts ===
Weekly chart performance for Rudebox
Chart (2006)	Peak position
Argentine Albums (CAPIF)	1
Australian Albums (ARIA)	1
Austrian Albums (Ö3 Austria)	1
Belgian Albums (Ultratop Flanders)	2
Belgian Albums (Ultratop Wallonia)	3
Croatian International Albums (HDU)	1
Danish Albums (Hitlisten)	1
Dutch Albums (Album Top 100)	2
European Albums Chart	1
Finnish Albums (Suomen virallinen lista)	1
French Albums (SNEP)	3
German Albums (Offizielle Top 100)	1
Hungarian Albums (MAHASZ)	3
Italian Albums (FIMI)	1
New Zealand Albums (RMNZ)	14
Norwegian Albums (VG-lista)	8
Polish Albums (ZPAV)	17
Portuguese Albums (AFP)	23
Spanish Albums (Promusicae)	4
Swedish Albums (Sverigetopplistan)	2
Swiss Albums (Schweizer Hitparade)	1
Taiwanese Albums (Five Music)	1
UK Albums (Official Charts)	1

=== Year-end charts ===
2006 year-end chart performance for Rudebox
Chart (2006)	Position
Australian Albums (ARIA)	23
Austrian Albums (Ö3 Austria)	17
Belgian Albums (Ultratop Flanders)	42
Belgian Albums (Ultratop Wallonia)	50
Dutch Albums (Album Top 100)	25
European Albums (Billboard)	29
French Albums (SNEP)	81
German Albums (Offizielle Top 100)	22
Hungarian Albums (MAHASZ)	27
Italian Albums (FIMI)	24
Swedish Albums (Sverigetopplistan)	62
Swiss Albums (Schweizer Hitparade)	18
UK Albums (OCC)	36

2007 year-end chart performance for Rudebox
Chart (2007)	Position
Austrian Albums (Ö3 Austria)	65
Dutch Albums (Album Top 100)	83
European Albums (Billboard)	79
German Albums (Offizielle Top 100)	70
Italian Albums (FIMI)	85

== Certifications and sales ==
Certifications and sales for Rudebox
Region	Certification	Certified units/sales
Argentina (CAPIF)	2× Platinum	80,000^{^}
Australia (ARIA)	2× Platinum	140,000^{^}
Austria (IFPI Austria)	2× Platinum	60,000^{*}
Belgium (BRMA)	Platinum	50,000^{*}
Denmark (IFPI Danmark)	Platinum	40,000^{^}
Finland (Musiikkituottajat)	Platinum	33,465
France (SNEP)	Platinum	200,000^{*}
Germany (BVMI)	3× Platinum	600,000^{^}
Hungary (MAHASZ)	2× Platinum	12,000^{^}
Ireland (IRMA)	2× Platinum	30,000^{^}
Italy 2006 sales	—	150,000
India	Gold	10,000
Mexico (AMPROFON)	Platinum	100,000^{^}
Netherlands (NVPI)	Platinum	70,000^{^}
Portugal (AFP)	Gold	10,000^{^}
Russia (NFPF)	Gold	10,000^{*}
Spain (Promusicae)	Gold	40,000^{^}
Sweden (GLF)	Gold	30,000^{^}
Switzerland (IFPI Switzerland)	2× Platinum	60,000^{^}
United Kingdom (BPI)	2× Platinum	600,000^{^}
Summaries
Europe (IFPI)	2× Platinum	2,000,000^{*}
^{*} Sales figures based on certification alone.^{^} Shipments figures based on certification alone.

== See also ==
- "Close My Eyes", a remix single of "We're the Pet Shop Boys"
