= Naked Elvis =

- Genre: Game show
- Presented by: Tania Strecker
- Starring: Marc Fossey, Sam Cullingworth and two others as "Naked Elvis"
- Country of origin: United Kingdom
- Original language: English
- No. of series: 1
- No. of episodes: 17

Production
- Executive producers: Remy Blumenfeld and Gavin Hay
- Production company: Brighter Pictures

Original release
- Network: Channel 4
- Release: 10 August – 3 December 1999

Naked Elvis is a late-night British television quiz show on Channel 4 from 10 August to 3 December 1999 hosted by Tania Strecker. Two teams of students would answer general knowledge questions. There was a scoremaster dressed as Elvis Presley played by Marc Fossey, Sam Cullingworth and two others who would remove one item of clothing between each round until he was naked.
