= Language Barrier (album) =

Studio album by Sly and Robbie
- Released: 1985
- Studio: RPM, NYC; Compass Point, Nassau, Bahamas; Channel One, Kingston, Jamaica
- Genre: Dub, world music
- Length: 39:35
- Label: Island
- Producer: Bill Laswell

Sly and Robbie chronology
Sounds of Taxi (1984)	Language Barrier (1985)	Rhythm Killers (1987)

Language Barrier is a studio album by Jamaican musical duo Sly and Robbie, released in 1985 by Island Records. The album features guest musicians Herbie Hancock, Bob Dylan, Afrika Bambaataa, and Manu DiBango.

== Release and reception ==
Professional ratings
Review scores
Source	Rating
AllMusic	3/5 stars

AllMusic awarded the album with three stars and its review by Scott Bultman states: "Sly & Robbie team with producer Bill Laswell for an edgy dub set". Village Voice critic Robert Christgau called it a "world-music mishmash".

The single "Make 'Em Move" reached No. 83 on the UK Singles Chart in November 1985. The album brought the duo international recognition and led on to their subsequent hit album Rhythm Killers in 1987.

The album entered the top twenty albums chart of the University of Toronto, Scarborough Campus, Community Radio (CSCR) in September 1985, as published in the 17th September 1985 issue of The Underground.

== Track listing ==
1. "Make 'Em Move" (S. Dunbar, R. Shakespeare, B. Aasim, B. Laswell, B. Worrell) — 7:58
2. "No Name on the Bullet" (S. Dunbar, R. Shakespeare) — 6:03
3. "Miles (Black Satin)" (Miles Davis, S. Dunbar, R. Shakespeare, B. Laswell) — 7:20
4. "Bass and Trouble" (B. Laswell, S. Dunbar, R. Shakespeare, Manu Dibango) — 7:58
5. "Language Barrier" (Wally Badarou, S. Dunbar, R. Shakespeare, M. Chung, B. Reynolds) — 6:51
6. "Get to This, Get to That" (S. Dunbar, R. Shakespeare, B. Fowler, B. Worrell) — 5:17

== Personnel ==
Musicians

- Sly Dunbar – drums, percussion
- Robbie Shakespeare – bass
- Wally Badarou – keyboards
- Herbie Hancock – keyboards
- Bernie Worrell – keyboards
- Robbie Lyn – keyboards
- Manu Dibango –saxophone
- Bob Dylan – harmonica
- Africa Bambaataa – vocals
- Bernard Fowler – vocals
- Doug E Fresh – human beatbox
- Eddie Martinez – guitar
- Pat Thrall – guitar
- Mike Hampton – guitar
- Mikey Chung – guitar
- Barry Reynolds – guitar
- Daniel Ponce – percussion

Technical personnel

- Clive Smith – Fairlight CMI programming
- Robert Musso, Steven Stanley, Solgie – engineers
- Howie Weinberg – mastering
- Tony Wright – art direction
- Chris Garnham – photography
- Issey Miyake – glasses
