= Rudebox (song) =

2006 single by Robbie Williams

Single by Robbie Williams

from the album Rudebox
- B-side: "Lonestar Rising"
- Released: 4 September 2006
- Studio: Wendy House (London, England)
- Genre: Electro-funk; pop
- Length: 4:45 (album version); 3:46 (radio edit)
- Label: Chrysalis
- Songwriters: Robbie Williams; Kelvin Andrews; Danny Spencer; Bill Laswell; Carl Aiken; William Collins; Sly Dunbar; Robbie Shakespeare
- Producer: Soul Mekanik

Robbie Williams singles chronology
"Sin Sin Sin" (2006)	"Rudebox" (2006)	"Lovelight" (2006)

Music video
- "Rudebox" on YouTube

"Rudebox" is song by English musician Robbie Williams from his seventh studio album, Rudebox (2006). It interpolates the 1987 song "Boops (Here to Go)" by Sly and Robbie. The single was released on 4 September 2006, although download purchases allowed it to reach number 30 on the UK Singles Chart on 3 September. After the release of the CD single, it ascended 26 places to number four, selling 24,821 copies.

The track was nominated for the 2006 Ivor Novello Award. In the song Williams makes several cultural references including Adidas, T.K. Maxx (in a joke about product placement, "T.K. Maxx costs less!"), Michael Jackson, Special Olympics, Durex condoms, The Matrix and Mandrax.

== Reception ==
The single received widespread criticism from both critics and fans and has been described by Robbie Williams himself as the biggest mistake of his career. Several British newspapers heavily criticized the song upon its release, contributing to a media circus around its unconventional style and departure from his previous sound.

== Commercial performance ==
"Rudebox" had considerable success in Europe, peaking at number two on the European Hot 100 Singles chart. The single reached number one in Germany, Italy, and Switzerland and entered the top 10 in several other countries around the world. In the United Kingdom, the single debuted at number 30 based on downloads alone; when the single was physically released, it climbed to its peak of number four on the UK Singles Chart, spending two weeks inside the top 10 and nine weeks on the chart overall. In Mexico, the song won the award for Song of the Year – International at the 2007 Premios Oye! ceremony.

== Track listings ==
- UK CD1 and European CD single
1. "Rudebox" (radio edit)
2. "Lonestar Rising"
- UK CD2 and Australian CD single
1. "Rudebox" (album version)
2. "Rudebox" (Soul Mekanik dub)
3. "Rudebox" (Chicken Lips Malfunction)
4. "Rudebox" (Chicken Lips Malfunction dub)
5. "Rudebox" (video)
6. "Rudebox" (interview clip)

== Credits and personnel ==
Credits are taken from the Rudebox album booklet.

Studios

- Recorded at Wendy House Studios (London, England)
- Mixed at Twenty One Studios (London, England)
- Mastered at Metropolis Studios (London, England)

Personnel

- Robbie Williams – writing, lead vocals, backing vocals
- Kelvin Andrews – writing, backing vocals, Moog, synthesisers, programming
- Danny Spencer – writing, backing vocals, Moog, synthesisers, programming
- Bill Laswell – writing ("Boops (Here to Go)")
- Carl Aiken – writing ("Boops (Here to Go)")
- William Collins – writing ("Boops (Here to Go)")
- Sly Dunbar – writing ("Boops (Here to Go)")
- Robbie Shakespeare – writing ("Boops (Here to Go)")
- Charmaine Baines – featured vocals
- Marsha Thomason – featured vocals
- Richard Scott – backing vocals
- Soul Mekanik – production
- Jeremy Wheatley – mixing
- Matt Kemp – engineering
- Tony Cousins – mastering

== Charts ==
=== Weekly charts ===
Chart (2006)	Peak position
Australia (ARIA)	13
Austria (Ö3 Austria Top 40)	5
Belgium (Ultratop 50 Flanders)	4
Belgium (Ultratop 50 Wallonia)	17
CIS Airplay (TopHit)	19
Czech Republic Airplay (ČNS IFPI)	18
Denmark (Tracklisten)	3
Europe (Eurochart Hot 100)	2
Europe (European Hit Radio)	15
Finland (Suomen virallinen lista)	2
Finland Airplay (Radiosoittolista)	8
France (SNEP)	31
Germany (GfK)	1
Hungary (Rádiós Top 40)	15
Ireland (IRMA)	17
Italy (FIMI)	1
Italy (Musica e dischi)	1
Latvia (Latvijas Top 50)	16
Netherlands (Dutch Top 40)	6
Netherlands (Single Top 100)	6
Norway (VG-lista)	14
Russia Airplay (TopHit)	19
Scottish Singles Sales (Official Charts)	3
Spain (Promusicae)	5
Sweden (Sverigetopplistan)	16
Switzerland (Schweizer Hitparade)	1
Turkey (Türkiye Top 20)	1
Ukraine Airplay (TopHit)	74
UK Singles (Official Charts)	4
UK Airplay (Music Week)	18

=== Year-end charts ===
Chart (2006)	Position
Austria (Ö3 Austria Top 40)	65
Belgium (Ultratop 50 Flanders)	58
Belgium (Ultratop 50 Wallonia)	96
Europe (Eurochart Hot 100)	27
Germany (Media Control GfK)	40
Italy (FIMI)	16
Netherlands (Dutch Top 40)	75
Netherlands (Single Top 100)	57
Switzerland (Schweizer Hitparade)	41
UK Singles (OCC)	103
