= Sidewalk University =

Studio album by Shinehead
- Released: 1992
- Genre: Dancehall, pop-soul, rap
- Label: Elektra

Shinehead chronology
The Real Rock (1990)	Sidewalk University (1992)	Troddin' (1994)

Sidewalk University is an album by the musician Shinehead. It was released in 1992 via Elektra Records. Shinehead supported the album with the "Sidewalk University Tour", which included Worl-A-Girl among its supporting acts. He also participated in Reggae Sunsplash 1993, his third time and his first as the headliner.

The album peaked at No. 94 on Billboard's Top R&B/Hip-Hop Albums chart. "Jamaican in New York" and "Let Them In" charted in the UK.

== Production ==
Norman Cook helped to produce Sidewalk University. "I Just Called to Say I Love You" is a cover of the Stevie Wonder song. "Jamaican in New York" is a rewrite of Sting's "Englishman in New York". Paul McCartney's "Let 'Em In" is used to express support for underrecognized Jamaican dancehall musicians. "Peace and Love" is performed in a roots reggae style. Shinehead deemed the sound of the album "culturally confused." He tended to avoid bragging in his songs, preferring to spin tales or make jokes.

== Critical reception ==
Professional ratings
Review scores
Source	Rating
AllMusic	2/5 stars
Entertainment Weekly	A
Los Angeles Times	2/4 stars

The Los Angeles Times wrote that Shinehead "misfires on his fourth album, half of which veers toward mainstream pop-soul, the other half toward routine dancehall reggae... He's capable of more." The Philadelphia Inquirer concluded that "Shinehead offers a glimpse of the future of dancehall: culturally relevant themes expressed in both confident singing voice and authoritative raps, supported by grooves that can glide from smooth conventional reggae to more agitated, street-oriented beats without missing a step." The Chicago Tribune determined that Shinehead returns "to more of a street feel, while making some smoother moves between the many musical styles (pop, rap, rock and reggae) and roles (Jamaican toaster, Bronx homeboy, sophisticated soulster, erudite sidewalk university professor) he likes to play."

The Record deemed the album "a characteristically broad-based mix of reggae, rap, R&B, and dance hall." Entertainment Weekly noted that the album "combines all of his best impulses, including joyous black pride and sensible street talk." The Observer stated: "The sum of the parts is a vibrant, inventive tour-de-force, a true Nineties hybrid."

AllMusic panned the album, writing that Shinehead's "rap style was rote and his rhymes forgettable."

== Track listing ==
No.	Title	Length
1.	"Try My Love"
2.	"Jamaican in New York"
3.	"Rainbow"
4.	"Peace and Love"
5.	"Sidewalk University"
6.	"Should I (Remix)"
7.	"I Can Make It Right"
8.	"Let Them In"
9.	"Start an Avalanche"
10.	"The Pen"
11.	"I Just Called to Say I Love You"
12.	"The Race of Life"
13.	"Trouble"
14.	"Friendly Advice"

== Charts ==
Weekly chart performance for Sidewalk University
Chart (1992)	Peak position
Australian Albums (ARIA)	171
