= She's Madonna =

2007 single by Robbie Williams

Single by Robbie Williams with Pet Shop Boys

from the album Rudebox
- B-side: "Never Touch That Switch"
- Released: 5 March 2007
- Studio: Sarm West (London, England)
- Genre: Synth-pop
- Length: 4:16
- Label: Chrysalis; EMI
- Songwriters: Robbie Williams; Neil Tennant; Chris Lowe
- Producer: Pet Shop Boys

Robbie Williams singles chronology
"Lovelight" (2006)	"She's Madonna" (2007)	"Close My Eyes" (2009)

Pet Shop Boys singles chronology
"Numb" (2006)	"She's Madonna" (2007)	"Integral" (2007)

Music video
- "She's Madonna" on YouTube

"She's Madonna" is a song by British singer Robbie Williams with the duo Pet Shop Boys, from his seventh studio album, Rudebox (2006). The track was released as its third and final international single on 5 March 2007 by Chrysalis Records. The subject matter of the song is a reference to the conversation Williams had with his ex-girlfriend Tania Strecker, over the reason her former boyfriend Guy Ritchie gave for leaving her for American singer Madonna. Williams had played the recording to Madonna shortly after writing it, receiving a positive reaction.

Musically, "She's Madonna" was inspired by Kraftwerk's 1983 single, "Tour de France". The composition consists of a "gurgling" electro backing, over which Williams sings the lyrics, talking about his fascination with Madonna. It received positive feedback for its musical aspects and the production by Pet Shop Boys. The song had minor chart placement in Williams' home turf United Kingdom, but reached the top five of the record charts in many European nations, attaining Gold certifications in Denmark and Germany. A music video for the track was released in April 2007, directed by Johan Renck whose main inspiration behind it was to portray the paranoia one faces onstage. It features a plethora of well-known drag queens, and showed Williams himself in full drag queen regalia. The video received mostly negative reception from critics.

== Background ==
"She's Madonna" is a collaboration between Williams and Pet Shop Boys, and served as the fifth and final single from Williams' seventh studio album, Rudebox (2006). By the time the single was supposed to be released, he had just come out from rehab following his addiction problems. "She's Madonna" was inspired by a conversation Williams had with his ex-girlfriend Tania Strecker, who told the story of how her boyfriend, British director Guy Ritchie, left her for American singer Madonna. Strecker quoted Ritchie as saying, "Look, you know I really love you, but she's Madonna." Williams considered the song to be one of Rudebox's lighter moments, clarifying that the track did not have a tongue in cheek connotation about it. Rather it literally spoke about his fantasies for Madonna and he was happy with the song's outcome. According to Contactmusic.com, Williams had played the song to Madonna shortly after writing it, receiving a positive reaction.

== Composition ==
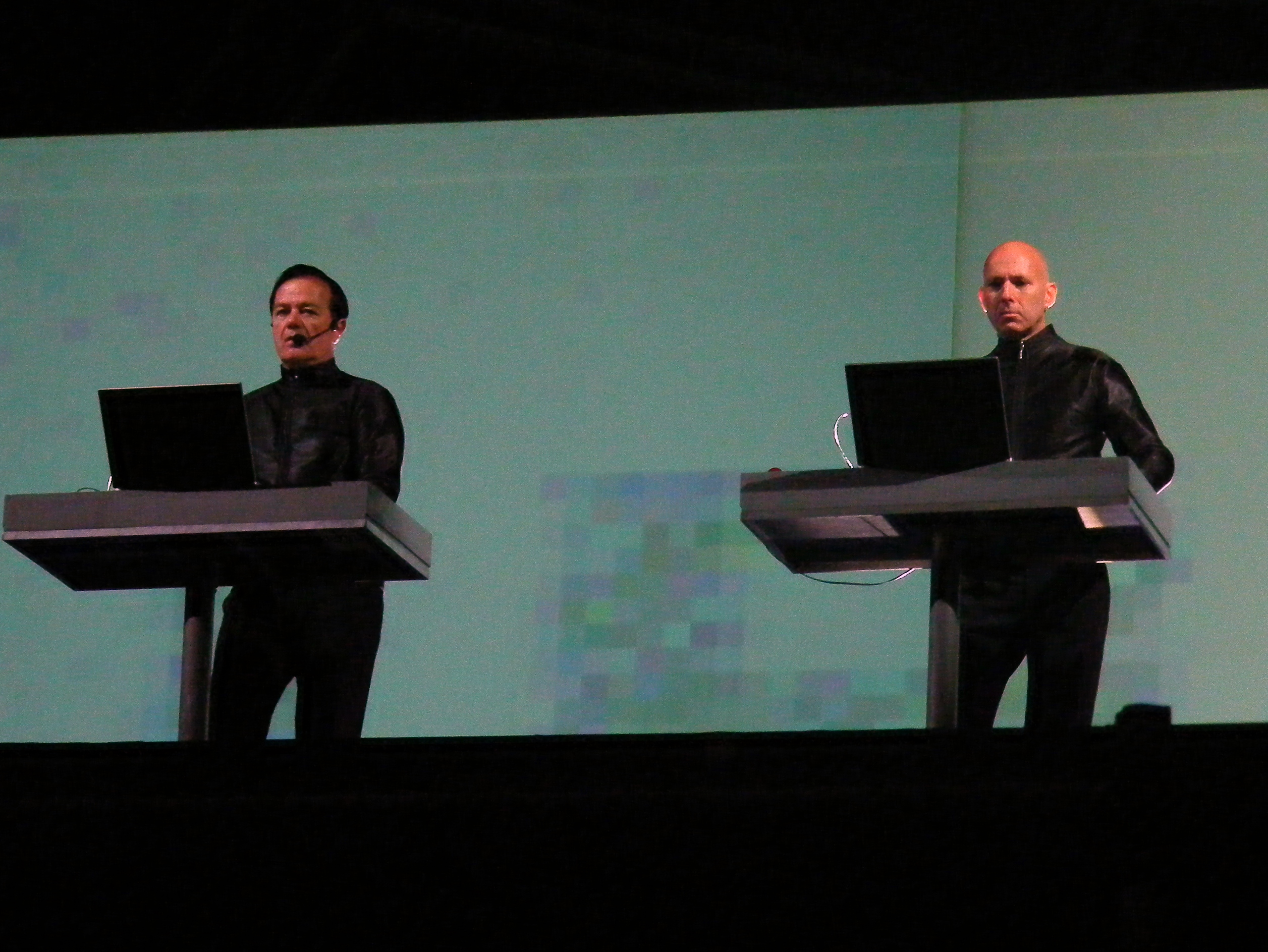
Inspiration for "She's Madonna" came from Kraftwerk's 1983 single, "Tour de France"

Musically, the song was inspired by Kraftwerk's 1983 single, "Tour de France". After playing the track, Williams asked Pet Shop Boys if they can include something inline in "She's Madonna", following which the latter song was composed. The track starts with a "gurgling" electro backing over which Williams sings the lyrics, talking about his fascination with Madonna, "We're having drinks with Kate and Stella, Gwyneth's here and she's brought her fella". Michael Hubbard from musicOMH described the lyrics as a "wannabe anthem/love letter" to Madonna.

According to the sheet music of the song, it is composed in common time with a temp of 124 beats per minute. Williams' vocals range from C_{4} to G♭_{5} and the track has a s basic sequence of F–A♭–Gm_{7}–C as the chord progression. "She's Madonna" was the subject of a controversy after actor & singer-songwriter Ashley Hamilton claimed that he came up with part of the song with Williams.

== Critical reception ==
Upon its release in the United Kingdom on 5 March 2007, "She's Madonna" received generally positive reviews from music critics. Nick Levine from Digital Spy awarded it three out of five stars, noting that the track was a kind of "damage control" for Williams' fallen public image following his rehabilitation. "Who'd have guessed he'd sound so comfortable—his most convincing in years, actually—singing about one of the few people in the world who's more famous than him [Madonna]?", Levine concluded. Alexis Petridis from The Guardian described the track as a "brilliant, icy meditation on fame's corrupting power". NME's Priya Elan listed "She's Madonna" as one of Williams' most "bonkers song ever", along with three other songs from Rudebox: "The 80's", "The 90's" and "The Actor". Hubbard explained that the Pet Shop Boys brought an "added spray of sheen to the glacially excellent" song, and working with them brought some "credibility" to it. Julie Broadfoot from BBC Music described "She's Madonna" as a "weird but fun tune". Lauren Murphy from Entertainment website noted that Pet Shop Boys' own musical influence was prevalent in the track, with its "sparse, spacey glow and not least on synth-laden tongue-in-cheek homage" of the song.

In an overall negative review for Rudebox, Ed Power from Hot Press magazine wrote that it was not until as the "album lurches towards its midpoint does some calm descend. 'She's Madonna', coasting on a glossy Pet Shop Boys production job, is a misty eyed ballad in the tradition of Williams' finest—i.e. slushiest—work". The song received further negative feedback from David Hutchison of Attitude magazine, during a retrospective review for the album. He theorized that Williams' random choice of cover version of songs gave it a feeling of being an old mixtape. This was vividly noticeable in the "outrageous break-up fantasy played out over icy synths and euphoric hand-claps" of "She's Madonna".

== Chart performance ==
In the United Kingdom, "She's Madonna" debuted outside the top 10 of the UK Singles Chart, at number 16. It was Williams' lowest-peaking single since "Sin Sin Sin" (2006) peaked at number 22. "She's Madonna" quickly descended down the charts, being present only for three weeks in total. It had a better chart placement in Scotland, where it entered the top 10 at number 9. In Ireland it debuted at number 38 and was present only for one week on the chart.

Across Europe, the song had better chart placements, and reached the top five of the charts in Belgium (Flanders), Denmark, Germany, Italy, Netherlands and Spain, remaining on the charts for multiple weeks. It received Gold certifications from Denmark and Germany, for shipment of 15,000 and 150,000 copies of the single, respectively. Although the song was not released in the United States, promotional CDs were sent to DJs and hence it charted on Billboard's Dance Club Songs, reaching a peak of number 12.

== Music video ==
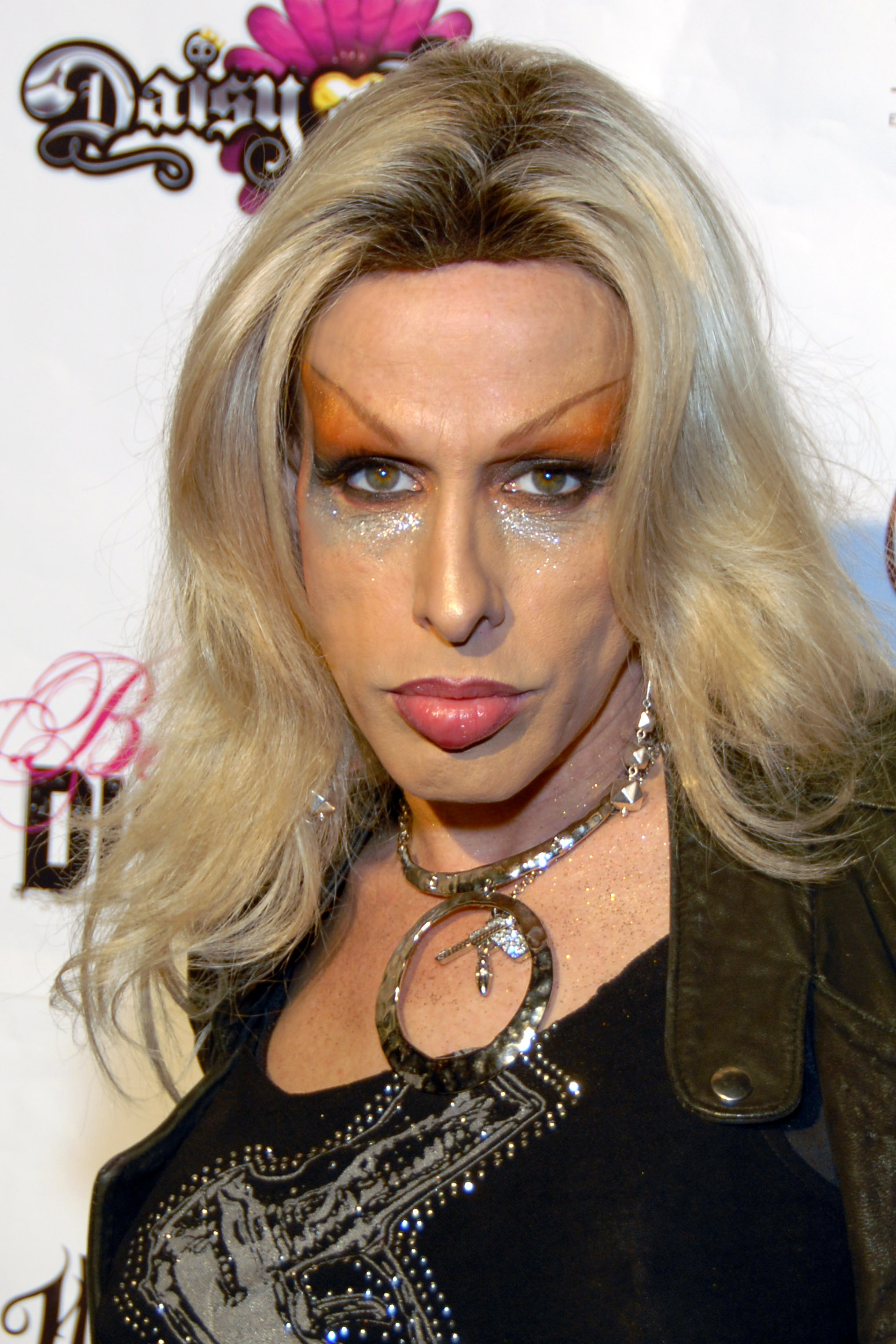
Alexis Arquette appeared as one of the drag queens in the video

The music video features Williams as a professional drag queen in full regalia, as well as performing with drag queens in a nightclub, dressed in a white jacket. His hairstyle and the wig was compared to those of Lily Allen and Uma Thurman's wig in the film Pulp Fiction (1994). Alexis Arquette appeared as one of the drag queens, along with RuPaul's Drag Race contestant Tammie Brown. The video was directed by Johan Renck. Despite media speculation, Williams did not imitate Madonna in the video, nor did she appear in it. Renck explained that the main inspiration behind the video was to portray the paranoia one faces onstage.

With a past as a musician, I remember sometimes feeling like the audience was against me while I was on stage [...] Even if that wasn't noticeable in any way, I still felt as if they all disliked me, or at least, misunderstood me, deep inside. That paranoia was kind of firmly rooted inside of me—the fear of being the wrong artist in front of the wrong audience. Thus, the idea for 'She's Madonna' deals with that.

The video opens with an interview with Williams, where he is asked about his real persona and his stage one. Then it cuts to him dressing up in a suit and going onstage to sing the song in front of an audience of drag queens. Thomas Rogers from Salon criticized the video for portraying drag queens like "patients in a mental ward" as well as the interview sequence, which he felt equated drag queens as people with multiple personality disorder. A writer for Metro questioned "Is Robbie trying to send us a message? Or has he just got extremely carried away playing dress up in his mother's wardrobe."

== Track listings ==
- UK CD single
1. "She's Madonna" – 4:16
2. "Never Touch That Switch" (Switch remix) – 5:06
- UK maxi-single
1. "She's Madonna" – 4:16
2. "She's Madonna" (Chris Lake remix) – 7:58
3. "She's Madonna" (Kris Menace vocal re-interpretation) – 4:24
4. "She's Madonna" (Kris Menace dub) – 5:37
- UK DVD single
1. "She's Madonna" (video)
2. "Never Touch That Switch" (Nightmoves remix audio) – 6:52
3. "Never Touch That Switch" (Dark Horse remix audio) – 4:33

== Credits and personnel ==
Credits are adapted from the Rudebox album booklet.

Studios

- Recorded and mixed at Sarm West (London, England)
- Mastered at Metropolis Studios (London, England)

Personnel

- Robbie Williams – writing, lead vocals
- Pet Shop Boys – production
  - Neil Tennant – writing
  - Chris Lowe – writing, programming
- Pete Gleadall – programming
- Tim Weidner – mixing, engineering
- Tony Cousins – mastering

== Charts ==
=== Weekly charts ===
Weekly chart performance for "She's Madonna"
Chart (2007)	Peak position
Austria (Ö3 Austria Top 40)	14
Belgium (Ultratop 50 Flanders)	3
Belgium (Ultratop 50 Wallonia)	10
CIS Airplay (TopHit)	20
CIS Airplay (TopHit) Kris Menace vocal re-interpretation	70
Croatia (HRT)	2
Czech Republic Airplay (ČNS IFPI)	2
Denmark (Tracklisten)	4
European Hot 100 Singles (Billboard)	4
Europe (European Hit Radio)	9
Finland (Suomen virallinen lista)	13
Finland Airplay (Radiosoittolista)	1
Germany (GfK)	4
Germany Airplay (BVMI)	2
Greece (IFPI Greece)	22
Hungary (Rádiós Top 40)	7
Ireland (IRMA)	38
Italy (FIMI)	3
Italy (Musica e dischi)	3
Latvia (Latvijas Top 50)	3
Netherlands (Dutch Top 40)	2
Netherlands (Single Top 100)	3
Romania (Romanian Top 100)	35
Russia Airplay (TopHit)	20
Russia Airplay (TopHit) Kris Menace vocal re-interpretation	69
Scottish Singles Sales (Official Charts)	9
Spain (Promusicae)	3
Sweden (Sverigetopplistan)	20
Switzerland (Schweizer Hitparade)	8
UK Singles (Official Charts)	16
UK Airplay (Music Week)	37
Ukraine Airplay (TopHit)	44
Ukraine Airplay (TopHit) Kris Menace vocal re-interpretation	64
US Dance Club Songs (Billboard)	12

=== Year-end charts ===
Year-end chart performance for "She's Madonna"
Chart (2007)	Position
Austria (Ö3 Austria Top 40)	67
Belgium (Ultratop 50 Flanders)	42
Belgium (Ultratop 50 Wallonia)	44
CIS Airplay (TopHit)	120
European Hot 100 Singles (Billboard)	59
Germany (Media Control GfK)	36
Hungary (Rádiós Top 40)	57
Italy (FIMI)	27
Latvia (Latvijas Top 50)	14
Netherlands (Dutch Top 40)	31
Netherlands (Single Top 100)	31
Russia Airplay (TopHit)	115
Romania (Romanian Top 100)	85
Sweden (Sverigetopplistan)	86
Switzerland (Schweizer Hitparade)	43

== Certifications ==
Certifications and sales for "She's Madonna"
Region	Certification	Certified units/sales
Denmark (IFPI Danmark)	Gold	7,500^{^}
Germany (BVMI)	Gold	150,000^{^}
Italy (FIMI)	—	15,000
^{^} Shipments figures based on certification alone.
