= Lewis Taylor =

- Birth name: Andrew Lewis Taylor
- Also known as: Andrew Taylor, Andy Taylor, Sheriff Jack
- Born: 20 January 1966 (age 59); London, England
- Genres: Neo soul, psychedelia
- Instrument(s): Voice; Guitar; Bass; Piano
- Years active: 1986–2006; 2021–present
- Labels: Slow Reality

Lewis Taylor (born 20 January 1966) is a British multi-instrumentalist musician, born and raised in Barnet, North London, England, in the late 1960s. He started in the music business as a guitarist touring with the psychedelic rock band Edgar Broughton Band. In 1986 he began performing as Sheriff Jack, releasing two albums of psychedelia music, Laugh Yourself Awake (1986) and What Lovely Melodies! (1987). As Lewis Taylor, he released his self-titled album in 1996, through Island Records, with tracks including "Bittersweet" and "Lucky" being released as singles. The album showcased a significant departure from psychedelia towards neo soul and was highly acclaimed. However, it became "an album that everybody talked about but few bought".

His follow-up album, which was less of a soul record and included more elements of psychedelia and Brian Wilson-style arrangements, was rejected by Island Records. Taylor scrapped the whole record (though he'd release it in 2004 as The Lost Album), and started from scratch, recording Lewis II in the more commercial style that the record company wanted. Though they released the album in 2000, it too failed to connect and Taylor was dropped by the label.

Taylor released his next album Stoned, Part I in 2002 on his own label named Slow Reality (an anagram of his name), and followed it up in 2004 with, Stoned, Part II. Robbie Williams covered "Lovelight" from Stoned, Part I on his 2006 album, Rudebox.

In June 2006, Lewis Taylor retired from music. As Andrew Taylor, he had since been musical director and bass player for Gnarls Barkley, and guitarist/backing vocalist for the Edgar Broughton Band and The Drivers. In 2016, Caroline Records re-issued his debut album on CD with a bonus disc comprising the b-sides, Lucky remixes and extended version of "Bittersweet".

On 2 June 2021 a representative for Taylor announced that work had begun on his first new studio album in 17 years. On 10 June 2022 it was announced that the album, titled Numb, would be released on 26 August. The album was preceded by the single "Final Hour". The album was released early, on 15 June.

== Discography ==
Studio albums

- Lewis Taylor (1996)
- Lewis II (2000)
- Stoned, Part I (2002)
- Stoned, Part II (2004)
- The Lost Album (2004)
- Numb (2022)

Compilations

- Limited Edition 2002 (2002)
- Limited Edition 2004 (2004)

Singles/EPs

- 1996: "Lucky"
- 1996: "Whoever"
- 1997: "Bittersweet"
- 1997: "Lucky" (reissue)
- 1997: "Lucky" (Kruder & Dorfmeister Mixes)
- 1997: "Bittersweet" (12")
- 1997: "Bittersweet" (Lucas's Mixes 12")
- 2004: Reconsider – The 'Stoned Part II' EP (12")
- 2005: In Session 2005 (digital only release)
- 2005: Stoned Instrumentals (CDr, promo, EP)
- 2006: Stoned Live (Hacktone 3-track promo-only EP)
- 2006: Hide Your Heart Away (CD, EP, promo)
