= Tania Strecker =

Danish-British model and TV presenter (born 1973)

- Born: Tanya Strecker; 26 June 1973 (age 52); Denmark
- Occupations: Model and television presenter
- Years active: 1999–present
- Height: 1.78 m (5 ft 10 in)
- Children: Mia (b. 1996)
- Mother: Maren Enthoven

Tania Strecker (born 26 June 1973) is a Danish-British model and television presenter in the United Kingdom.

Her break into TV began with Channel 4's Naked Elvis, and she then co-hosted MTV's SELECT with Richard Blackwood. After several further presenting jobs, she joined The Big Breakfast with Richard Bacon, and then Beachmate.

== Personal life ==
She is the daughter of ex model Maren Enthoven, she took her stepfather David Strecker's surname. Between the ages of 5 and 7, she lived in Los Angeles; otherwise she spent her life in London. Her mother divorced her father, an asset manager, when she was very young. Strecker is of Danish maternal and Argentine paternal descent.

She has a daughter, Mia, born in 1996, from a relationship with the pub owner and convicted drug dealer James Mosbacher. They married when Strecker was 22, the couple later separated and divorced.

In 2005, Strecker married Anthony James de Rothschild, the eldest son of Evelyn de Rothschild and Victoria Schott.

She is the subject of the Robbie Williams song "She's Madonna".
