= Boops (Here to Go) =

1987 song by Sly and Robbie

Single by Sly and Robbie

from the album Rhythm Killers
- Released: 1987
- Genre: Electronic
- Length: 5:20
- Label: 4th & Broadway, Island
- Songwriters: Sly Dunbar, Robbie Shakespeare, Bill Laswell, Shinehead, Bootsy Collins
- Producers: Bill Laswell, Material

Official audio
- "Boops (Here to Go)" on YouTube

"Boops (Here to Go)" is a song by Jamaican duo Sly and Robbie, released in 1987 as the first single from the album Rhythm Killers. The song is their most successful in the United Kingdom, where it reached No. 12 on the UK Singles Chart in May 1987, and remained on the chart for a total of 11 weeks.

The song also reached No. 13 in New Zealand, and No. 58 in the Netherlands. It contains an interpolation from The Barber of Seville by Gioachino Rossini, and a rap by Shinehead.

In 2006, English musician Robbie Williams interpolated "Boops (Here to Go)" in his song "Rudebox", which was a number one hit in several countries.

== Track listing ==
UK 12"

A. "Boops (Here to Go)" - 5:20
B1. "Don't Stop the Music" - 5:45
B2. "Boops" (instrumental) - 4:04

== Charts ==
Chart (1987)	Peak position
Netherlands (Single Top 100)	58
New Zealand (Recorded Music NZ)	13
UK Singles (OCC)	12
