= The Real Rock =

Studio album by Shinehead
- Released: 1990
- Genre: Reggae, rap
- Label: Elektra

Shinehead chronology
Unity (1988)	The Real Rock (1990)	Sidewalk University (1992)

The Real Rock is a studio album by the reggae/rap musician Shinehead, released in 1990 via Elektra Records.

The album peaked at No. 155 on the Billboard 200.

== Production ==
The album was recorded in New York and Jamaica, with contributions from the rhythm section of Steely & Clevie. It contains interpretations of the songs "Family Affair", "Love and Marriage", and "Till I Kissed You". "World of the Video Game" samples the music of Super Mario Bros.

== Critical reception ==
Professional ratings
Review scores
Source	Rating
AllMusic	4/5 stars
Chicago Sun-Times	3/4 stars
Robert Christgau	(2-star Honorable Mention)
The Encyclopedia of Popular Music	2/5 stars
Los Angeles Times	2.5/5 stars
The Rolling Stone Album Guide	3/5 stars

The Los Angeles Times thought that "even the strongest songs are more well-crafted than inspirational, and the cleverest verbal forays are undercut by the musical retrenchment." Trouser Press wrote that "the music on The Real Rock is more sophisticated in terms of technology and styling, but the songs are hit-and-miss." The Washington Post declared that "the album's highlight ... is an inspired remake of Sly Stone's 'Family Affair', which mixes slap bass, scratching, soul singing and speed-rapping into an imaginative defense of black music, black neighborhoods and the black family." The Philadelphia Daily News called Shinehead "the most captivating and versatile of the reggae-rap artists."

AllMusic called the album "one of the best rap releases of 1990," writing that "the East Coast resident wisely avoids being predicable."

== Track listing ==
No.	Title	Length
1.	"The Real Rock"	4:07
2.	"Family Affair"	4:23
3.	"World of the Video Game"	3:42
4.	"Potential"	4:42
5.	"Good Things"	3:59
6.	"Strive"	4:16
7.	"Dance Down the Road"	3:50
8.	"Love and Marriage Rap"	4:12
9.	"Till I Kissed You"	4:14
10.	"Cigarette Breath"	3:28
11.	"Musical Madness"	4:00
