= Lovelight =

2006 single by Robbie Williams

Single by Robbie Williams

from the album Rudebox
- B-side: "Mess Me Up"
- Released: 13 November 2006
- Studio: Chung King, Allido Sound (New York City)
- Length: 4:02
- Label: Chrysalis
- Songwriter: Lewis Taylor
- Producer: Mark Ronson

Robbie Williams singles chronology
"Rudebox" (2006)	"Lovelight" (2006)	"She's Madonna" (2007)

Music video
- "Lovelight" on YouTube

"Lovelight" is a song written and originally performed by Lewis Taylor for his 2002 album, Stoned, Part I. In 2006, the song was covered by British singer Robbie Williams. His version was produced by Mark Ronson and was released as the second single from his seventh solo album, Rudebox, on 13 November 2006. Williams' version reached number eight on the UK Singles Chart and became a top-10 hit in five other European countries.

== Chart performance ==
"Lovelight" debuted at number 28 on the UK Singles Chart, a week before its physical single release. The song debuted on the Download Chart at number 29, later peaking at number 15. After its physical release, "Lovelight" reached number eight on the UK Singles Chart. In Sweden, the song debuted at number 23 on the Sverigetopplistan chart on digital single sales only. In Australia, "Lovelight" debuted at number 38 on the ARIA Top 40 Digital Track Chart. In the Netherlands, the song peaked at number eight on the Dutch Top 40.

== Music video ==
"Lovelight" features a music video that was directed by Jake Nava and filmed in Vienna, Austria during a break from Robbie Williams' European Close Encounters Tour. The video features Williams performing in a dark club (Semper Depot, Lehárgasse 6–8, Vienna-Mariahilf) accompanied by female dancers. The video premiered on ITV1 in the UK on 6 October 2006.

== Track listings ==
UK CD1 and European CD single

1. "Lovelight"
2. "Mess Me Up"

UK CD2

1. "Lovelight" (album version)
2. "Lovelight" (Soulwax Ravelight vocal mix)
3. "Lovelight" (Kurd Maverick vocal mix)
4. "Lovelight" (Soul Mekanik Mekanikal mix)
5. "Lovelight" (Dark Horse mix)
6. "Lovelight" (Soulwax Ravelight dub)

UK DVD single

1. "Lovelight" (video)
2. "Mess Me Up" (audio)
3. "Lovelight" (Soul Mekanik Mekanikal mix audio)
4. DVD trailer
5. Photo gallery

Italian 12-inch single

A1. "Lovelight" (Kurd Maverick vocal) – 6:47
A2. "Lovelight" (Kurd Maverick dub) – 8:04
B1. "Lovelight" – 4:02
B2. "Lovelight" (Soulwax Ravelight vocal) – 6:56

Australian CD single

1. "Lovelight" (album version)
2. "Lovelight" (Soulwax Ravelight vocal mix)
3. "Lovelight" (Kurd Maverick vocal mix)
4. "Lovelight" (Soul Mekanik Mekanikal mix)
5. "Lovelight" (Dark Horse mix)

== Credits and personnel ==
Credits are taken from the Rudebox album booklet.

Studios

- Recorded at Chung King and Allido Sound (New York City)
- Mixed at MixStar Studios (Virginia Beach, Virginia)
- Mastered at Metropolis Studios (London, England)

Personnel

- Lewis Taylor – writing
- Robbie Williams – lead vocals
- N'Dea Davenport – backing vocals
- Mark Ronson – electric guitar, scratches, beats, percussion, production, engineering
- Andrew Levy – bass guitar
- Raymond Angry – Fender Rhodes, Roland strings
- Sam Koppelman – percussion
- Dave Guy – trumpet
- Neal Sugarman – tenor saxophone
- Ian Hendrickson-Smith – baritone saxophone
- Serban Ghenea – mixing
- Vaughan Merrick – engineering
- Derek Pacuk – engineering
- Andy Marcinkowski – engineering assistance
- Jesse Gladstone – engineering assistance
- Tony Cousins – mastering

== Charts ==
=== Weekly charts ===
Chart (2006–2008)	Peak position
Australia (ARIA)	25
Austria (Ö3 Austria Top 40)	26
Belgium (Ultratop 50 Flanders)	18
Belgium (Ultratop 50 Wallonia)	28
CIS Airplay (TopHit)	115
Czech Republic Airplay (ČNS IFPI)	78
Denmark (Tracklisten)	7
Europe (Eurochart Hot 100)	15
Europe (European Hit Radio)	15
Finland (Suomen virallinen lista)	6
Finland Airplay (Radiosoittolista)	13
Germany (GfK)	21
Greece (IFPI)	37
Hungary (Rádiós Top 40)	18
Ireland (IRMA)	28
Italy (FIMI)	4
Italy (Musica e dischi)	4
Latvia (Latvijas Top 50)	8
Netherlands (Dutch Top 40)	8
Netherlands (Single Top 100)	9
Romania (Romanian Top 100)	30
Russia Airplay (TopHit)	112
Scottish Singles Sales (Official Charts)	4
Slovakia Airplay (ČNS IFPI)	9
Spain (Promusicae)	12
Sweden (Sverigetopplistan)	23
Switzerland (Schweizer Hitparade)	25
UK Singles (Official Charts)	8
UK Airplay (Music Week)	5
Ukraine Airplay (TopHit)	80
US Dance Club Songs (Billboard)	8

=== Year-end charts ===
Chart (2006)	Position
Netherlands (Dutch Top 40)	79
UK Singles (OCC)	175

Chart (2007)	Position
Hungary (Rádiós Top 40)	96

== Release history ==
Region	Date	Format(s)	Label(s)	Ref.
United Kingdom	13 November 2006	CD	Chrysalis	
Australia	20 November 2006	CD	Chrysalis	
