= Unity (Shinehead album) =

Studio album by Shinehead
- Released: 1988
- Genre: Rap, reggae
- Label: Elektra
- Producer: Jam Master Jay, Davy D, Claude Evans

Shinehead chronology
Rough and Rugged (1986)	Unity (1988)	The Real Rock (1990)

Unity is an album by the British Jamaican musician Shinehead, released in 1988.

The album peaked at No. 185 on the Billboard 200. "Gimme No Crack" was a minor radio hit.

== Production ==
"Come Together", "Truth", and "Chain Gang Rap" were produced by Jam Master Jay; the rest of the album was produced by Davy D and Claude Evans. Roots Radics contributed to the album. "Who the Cap Fits" is a remake of a song from Shinehead's debut album. "Chain Gang Rap" samples Duke Ellington's "Take the A Train" and incorporates elements of Sam Cooke's "Chain Gang". The title track samples "Come Together".

== Critical reception ==
Professional ratings
Review scores
Source	Rating
AllMusic	3/5 stars
The Encyclopedia of Popular Music	2/5 stars
MusicHound R&B: The Essential Album Guide	4/5 stars
The Rolling Stone Album Guide	3.5/5 stars
Tulsa World	3/4 stars

Trouser Press wrote that Shinehead "continues to mix yankee hip-hop and yardee MC." The New York Times noted that "Shinehead will drift into a falsetto voice to sing, parody somebody for a second, change the beat–nothing stays the same for long." The Gazette determined that Shinehead "proves himself one of the most inventive, intelligent rappers on the scene." The Philadelphia Inquirer concluded that Unity "contains rap, dub-poet toasting, and some of the leanest, most concise vocalizing anywhere in black pop."

The Washington Post stated: "A striking major-label debut, Unity is as rhythmically limber as it is well-meaning." The Los Angeles Times determined that "'Hello Y'All' combined a rap-style vocal with hard reggae rhythms ... 'Know How Fe Chat' reversed the equation by setting a patois-laden Jamaican vocal against a funk arrangement." The Toronto Star deemed the album "a comically-inspired fusion of rap and reggae."

AllMusic called the album "too lighthearted and positive to catch the ears of hip-hop heads who were beginning to lean on harsher sounds that were developing." The Chicago Tribune listed Unity as the sixth best album of 1988; the Star Tribune listed it as the fourteenth.

== Track listing ==
No.	Title	Length
1.	"Unity"
2.	"Chain Gang Rap"
3.	"The Truth"
4.	"Hello Y'All"
5.	"Do It with Ease"
6.	"Gimme No Crack"
7.	"Ragamuffin"
8.	"Know How Fe Chat"
9.	"Who the Cap Fits"
10.	"Golden Touch"
