= Close My Eyes (Sander van Doorn song) =

Single by Sander van Doorn vs. Robbie Williams
- Released: January 4, 2009
- Recorded: 2008
- Genre: Trance, techno
- Length: 2:49 (UK radio edit) 7:24 (original club version)
- Label: Spinnin' Records
- Songwriter: My Robot Friend
- Producers: Neil Tennant, Chris Lowe, Chris Zippel

Sander van Doorn singles chronology
"Organic" (2008)	"Close My Eyes" (2009)	"What Say" (2009)

Robbie Williams singles chronology
"She's Madonna" (2007)	"Close My Eyes" (2009)	"Bodies" (2009)

Music video
- Sander Van Doorn vs Robbie Williams "Close My Eyes" on YouTube

"Close My Eyes" is an electronic song from Dutch techno and trance music DJ and producer Sander van Doorn. The song features Robbie Williams and production by Pet Shop Boys and Chris Zippel. The remix is of the original version of the song called "We're the Pet Shop Boys", a track recorded by Robbie Williams, featuring Pet Shop Boys, from his album Rudebox. The track peaked at number five on the U.S. Billboard Hot Dance Club Songs chart. An official music video exists.

== Track listing ==
CD1

1. "Close My Eyes" (UK radio edit) – 2:49
2. "Close My Eyes" (original club version) – 7:24

CD2

1. "Close My Eyes" (UK radio edit) – 2:49
2. "Close My Eyes" (international radio edit) – 3:05
3. "Close My Eyes" (original club version) – 7:24
4. "Close My Eyes" (dub remix) – 6:08
5. "Close My Eyes" (international video) – 3:05

== Charts ==
Chart (2009)	Peak position
Netherlands Mega Single Top 100	7
German Singles Chart	33
U.S. Hot Dance Club Songs (original version, "We're the Pet Shop Boys")	5
