= Lewis II =

Studio album by Lewis Taylor
- Released: 28 August 2000
- Genre: Neo soul, pop rock
- Label: Island

Lewis Taylor chronology
Lewis Taylor (1996)	Lewis II (2000)	Stoned, Part I (2002)

Professional ratings
Review scores
Source	Rating
Allmusic	4/5 stars

Lewis II is the second album by the British neo-soul composer and multi-instrumentalist Lewis Taylor, released in 2000.

== Track listing ==
All songs by Lewis Taylor, except when mentioned.

1. Party - 6:01
2. My Aching Heart - 5:25
3. You Make Me Wanna - 4:46
4. The Way You Done Me - 5:12
5. Satisfied - 5:53
6. Never Be My Woman - 4:31
7. I'm on the Floor - 5:03
8. Lewis II - 5:05
9. Into You - 3:53
10. Blue Eyes - 3:45

UK edition bonus track

1. Everybody Here Wants You (Jeff Buckley) - 4:51

Japanese edition bonus tracks

1. Everybody Here Wants You (Jeff Buckley) - 4:51
2. Electric Ladyland (Jimi Hendrix) - 4:20
