= Stoned, Part I =

Stoned, Part 1

Studio album by Lewis Taylor
- Released: 21 October 2002
- Genre: Neo soul, pop rock
- Label: Slow Reality

Lewis Taylor chronology
| Lewis II (2000) | Stoned, Part 1 (2002) | Stoned, Part II (2004) |

Alternative cover

Professional ratings
Review scores
| Source | Rating |
|---|---|
| Allmusic | 4.5/5 stars |

Stoned, Part I is the third album by the British neo-soul composer and multi-instrumentalist Lewis Taylor, released in 2002.

== Track listing ==
Slow Reality release

1. "Stoned, Pt. I" (Taylor) – 4:51
2. "Positively Beautiful" (Taylor) – 4:24
3. "Lewis IV" (Sabina Smyth, Taylor) – 3:53
4. "Send Me an Angel" (Smyth, Taylor) – 4:36
5. "Til the Morning Light" (Smyth, Taylor) – 4:08
6. "Shame" (Smyth, Taylor) – 4:24
7. "When Will I Ever Learn, Pt. 1" (Smyth, Taylor) – 4:40
8. "Lovin' U More" (Taylor) – 4:14
9. "From the Day We Met, Pt. 2" (Smyth, Taylor) – 4:43
10. "Lovelight" (Taylor) – 4:53
11. "Sheneverdid" (Taylor) – 4:49

Hacktone release bonus tracks

12. "Stop, Look, Listen (To Your Heart)" (The Stylistics)
13. "Back Together"
14. "Throw Me a Line"
15. "Melt Away" (Brian Wilson)
16. "Ghosts" (hidden track) (Japan)
