= Limited Edition (Lewis Taylor album) =

Lewis Taylor

Compilation album by Lewis Taylor
- Released: 2002
- Genre: Acoustic, Neo-soul, Pop-rock
- Producer: Lewis Taylor

Limited Edition is a compilation album by British neo-soul composer and multi-instrumentalist Lewis Taylor. The album was limited to 100 copies and was released at his Noble Rot gig.

== Track listing ==
All songs are composed and written by Lewis Taylor, except where noted.

1. Track (acoustic)
2. Song (acoustic)
3. Lucky (acoustic)
4. If I Lay Down With You (acoustic)
5. Melt Away (Brian Wilson cover)
6. Stop, Look, Listen (The Stylistics cover)
7. Night Fever (The Bee Gees cover)
8. Highway Star (Deep Purple cover)
9. Heart of the Sunrise (Yes cover)
10. Black Dog (Led Zeppelin cover)
