= Lewis Taylor (album) =

Studio album by Lewis Taylor
- Released: 19 August 1996
- Genre: Neo soul
- Length: 50:11
- Label: Island
- Producer: Lewis Taylor

Lewis Taylor chronology
Lewis Taylor (1996)	Lewis II (2000)

Professional ratings
Review scores
Source	Rating
AllMusic	4.5/5 stars
Muzik	2/5 stars
Pitchfork	8.7/10

Lewis Taylor is the first album by the British neo-soul composer and multi-instrumentalist Lewis Taylor, released in 1996.

== Track listing ==
All songs are composed and written by Lewis Taylor except where indicated.

1. "Lucky" (Lewis Taylor/Sabina Smyth) – 6:34
2. "Bittersweet" – 5:36
3. "Whoever" – 4:30
4. "Track" (Lewis Taylor/Sabina Smyth) – 5:11
5. "Song" (Lewis Taylor/Sabina Smyth) – 4:56
6. "Betterlove" – 5:24
7. "How" – 3:59
8. "Right" – 4:27
9. "Damn" (Lewis Taylor/Sabina Smyth) – 6:04
10. "Spirit" – 3:15

Japanese edition bonus tracks

11. "I Dream the Better Dream"
12. "Waves"
