= Shinehead =

- Born: Edmund Carl Aiken; 10 April 1962 (age 64); Kent, England
- Genres: Reggae, reggae fusion, dancehall, hip hop
- Instrument: Vocalist
- Years active: 1986–present
- Labels: Elektra Records, African Love Records

Edmund Carl Aiken (born 10 April 1962), better known as Shinehead, is a British Jamaican reggae singer, toaster and rapper.

== Career ==
Aiken was born on 10 April 1962 in Kent, England. He began his music career by performing for different New York City reggae dancehall sound systems in the 1980s, most notably Tony Screw's Downbeat the Ruler, based in The Bronx.

His recording debut was in 1986 on the African Love Music independent record label with "Who the Cap Fits (Let Them Wear It)" from the album Rough & Rugged. In his early years, Jeff Buckley led his group on guitar and lent a hand with backing vocals. He appeared on Sly and Robbie's 1987 album, Rhythm Killers.

Shinehead was signed to a recording contract by A&R representative Raoul Roach with Elektra Records in 1988, and remained with the label until 1995.

His best-known single is the cover version of Sting's "Englishman in New York", retitled as "Jamaican in New York" (1993). It reached No. 30 on the UK Singles Chart in April 1993. The single featured on the Sidewalk University album.

He is largely credited as being one of the original acts to cross hip-hop with reggae music, now known as reggae fusion, with songs such as "Try My Love" in 1992. Shinehead's vocal talent can be heard across various tracks on the Unity (1988) and The Real Rock (1990) albums. His rapid deejay chat style can be heard on tracks such as "Cigarette Breath", "Gimme No Crack" and "Do It with Ease". Shinehead's melodic, singjay approach is present in songs such as "Strive", while he brings more hip hop flavour in tracks including "Chain Gang". "Chain Gang" was the first video to be shown during a regular season episode of Yo! MTV Raps, in 1988.

Shinehead is still active. He was part of the yearly Jamrock cruise in 2015. The same year, he played at the CES in Las Vegas. He has had success with his sound system, Kingston 12.

== Discography ==
=== Albums ===
- Rough & Rugged (1986)
- Unity (1988)
- The Real Rock (1990)
- Sidewalk University (1992)
- Troddin' (1994)
- Praises (1999)

=== Charted singles ===
List of singles, with selected chart positions
| Title | Year | Peak chart positions | | | | | | | Album |
| Title | Year | UK | AUS | BEL (FL) | FRA | GER | NZ | SWE | Album |
|---|---|---|---|---|---|---|---|---|---|
| "Try My Love" | 1992 | — | 193 | — | — | — | — | — | |
| "Jamaican in New York" | 1993 | 30 | 97 | 34 | 17 | 31 | 5 | 21 | Sidewalk University |
| "Let 'Em In" | 1993 | 70 | 153 | — | — | — | 13 | — | Sidewalk University |
