= Sly and Robbie =

Jamaican rhythm section and production duo

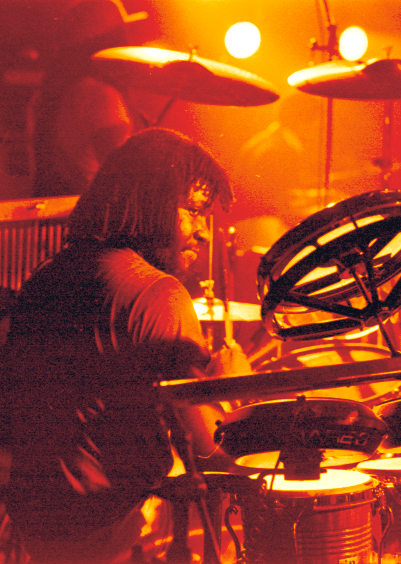
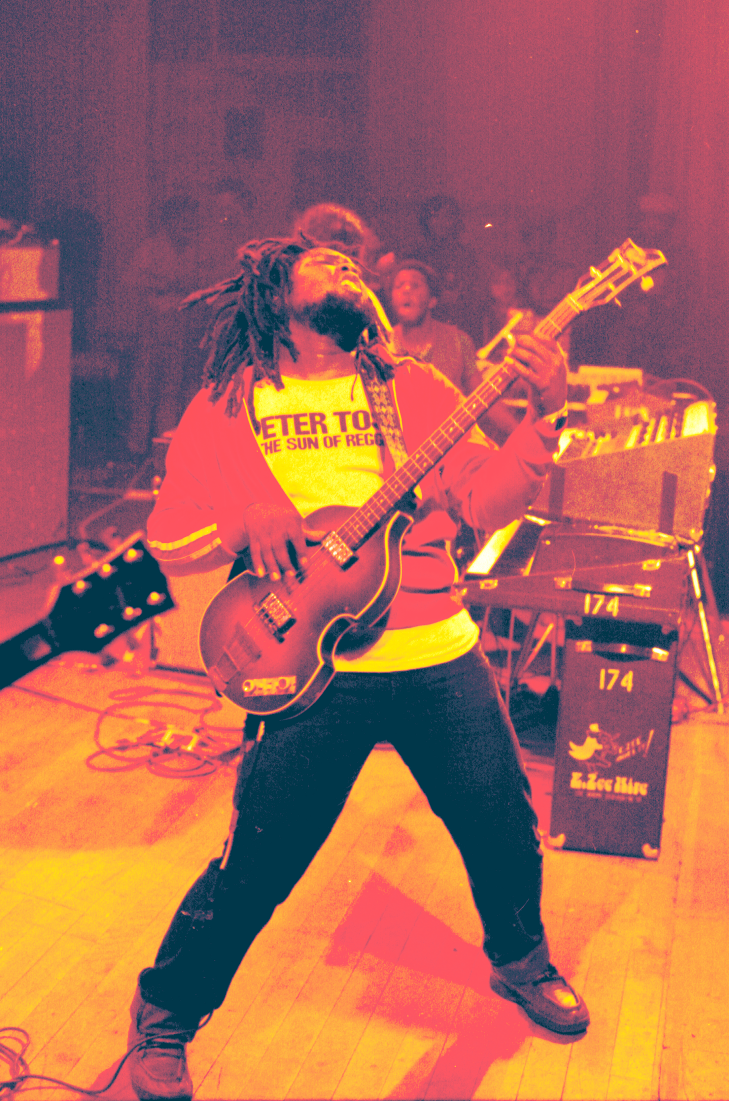
- Sly Dunbar (left) and Robbie Shakespeare in the late 1970s.

Background information
- Origin: Jamaica
- Genres: Reggae; dub
- Years active: 1970s–2021
- Labels: TAXI; Island
- Past members: Lowell "Sly" Dunbar (deceased); Robert "Robbie" Shakespeare (deceased)

Sly and Robbie were a prolific Jamaican rhythm section and production duo, associated primarily with the reggae and dub genres. Drummer Sly Dunbar and bassist Robbie Shakespeare teamed up in the mid-1970s after establishing themselves separately in Jamaica as professional musicians. They recorded several albums under the Sly and Robbie name, and made hundreds of appearances on records by other performers.

Shakespeare died in December 2021 following kidney surgery, and Dunbar on 26 January 2026.

== Career ==
=== 1970s: Beginnings in reggae ===
Sly Dunbar, then drumming for Skin Flesh and Bones, and Robbie Shakespeare, playing bass and guitar with the Aggrovators, discovered they had the same ideas about music in general (both were fans of Motown, Stax Records, the Philly Sound, and country music, in addition to Jamaican record labels Studio One and Treasure Isle), and reggae production in particular. Speaking on his influences, Sly explained “My mentor was the drummer for The Skatalites, Lloyd Knibb. And I used to listen a lot to the drummer for Booker T. & the M.G.'s, Al Jackson Jr., and a lot of Philadelphia. And there are other drummers in Jamaica, like Santa and Carly from The Wailers Band, Winston Bennett, Paul Douglas, Mikey Boo. I respect all these drummers and have learnt a lot from them. From them, I listened and created my own style. They played some things I copied, other things I recreated." Although Sly Dunbar and Robbie Shakespeare had previously performed together, they began working regularly as a rhythm section at Channel One Studios. Dunbar had played alongside bassist Ranchie McLean in Skin, Flesh and Bone, while Shakespeare had worked with Bunny Lee's Aggrovators. The Hoo Kim brothers recruited Skin, Flesh and Bone as the foundation of the Revolutionaries, bringing Dunbar and Shakespeare together at Channel One.

According to The Independent, their breakthrough album was The Mighty Diamonds' 1976 release Right Time, which helped to establish them as the "masters of groove and propulsion." The drum beat on the title song was particularly tricky; in 2001 Dunbar recalled, "When that tune first come out, because of that double tap on the rim nobody believe it was me on the drums, they thought it was some sort of sound effect we was using. Then when it go to number 1 and stay there, everybody started trying for that style and it soon become establish."

=== 1980s: Transition to digital ===
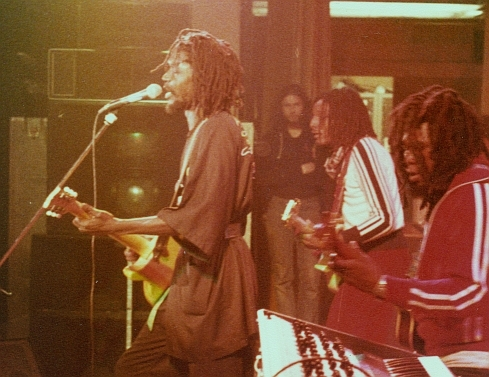
Robbie Shakespeare (right) playing with Peter Tosh on the Bush Doctor tour, 1978

In 1976, they introduced a harder beat called "Rockers", which quickly replaced the then-prevalent "One Drop" style, then introduced the "Rub a Dub" sound in the early 1980s. Sly and Robbie were important in developing the trend towards computer-assisted music and programming in the mid-1980s. Chris Blackwell made them the core of the Compass Point All Stars, the Nassau recording band based at Compass Point Studios that was to produce classic records for Grace Jones, Joe Cocker and Gwen Guthrie among many others.

In 1985, Sly and Robbie performed on the album Scacchi e tarocchi by Francesco De Gregori.

Their 1987 funk and dance album Rhythm Killers was produced by Bill Laswell with an ensemble of musicians and showcased the duo's branching outside of the reggae market and experimenting with electronic sounds. It also produced a number 12 hit on the UK Singles Chart in 1987 with "Boops (Here to Go)" which Robbie Williams later sampled for his single "Rudebox".

=== 1990s: Dancehall ===
In the early 1990s, Sly and Robbie introduced a novel sound with the hits "Bam Bam" and "Murder She Wrote" by Chaka Demus & Pliers. Chaka Demus' rough DJ vocals were matched with Pliers' sweet, melodic, soul-influenced singing; this unusual vocal pairing was championed by Sly and Robbie. This formula has since been used with success by the likes of Shaggy (who teamed up with singers Rayvon and Rik Rok), Shabba Ranks, Maxi Priest and others. This predates the trend in some rap music where a song's "hook" or chorus is sung by a guest, while the verses are rapped.

In the "Bam Bam" style, Dunbar introduced Indian tabla sounds in his drum beats, while Shakespeare altogether stopped playing bass on this particular project.

Sly & Robbie continued to innovate during the late 1990s and early 2000s, fusing dancehall and Latin music sounds (La Trenggae) or dancehall and hip-hop/R&B (their 2004 'Big Up' riddim). They had a second UK top 40 hit in 1997, collaborating with Simply Red on a cover of Gregory Isaacs' "Night Nurse", reaching number 13. Also in 1997, their collaboration with The Fugees was included on The Score, which went on to be one of the best selling albums of the decade. In 1999, their Strip to the Bone album paired them with Scottish electro producer Howie B, and together they explored new dub territories. Their 1999 single "Superthruster" from this album became a mainstream hit, whose music video was played on MTV frequently. The animated video depicted Sly and Robbie in battlesuits chasing a harlequin through a technological complex. As the video progresses, the harlequin turns out to be a marionette directed by the real villain. The early scene involving the Harlequin marionette bears at least a passing resemblance to Sven Väth's 1994 animated cult-video "Harlequin". "Superthruster" was released on vinyl and as a DVD single, its February 1999 release date making it one of or even the first DVD single ever to go on sale.

They won a Grammy Award in 1999 for the album Friends.

=== 2000–2021: Projects ===
In 2003, they compiled and mixed a DJ mix album, Late Night Tales: Sly & Robbie, as part of the Late Night Tales series for Azuli Records. Far from restricting themselves to the Jamaican scene, (in which they have played for virtually every prominent Jamaican musical artist from Beenie Man to Sean Paul to Peter Tosh, Black Uhuru, Gregory Isaacs, Dennis Brown, Spanner Banner, Ini Kamoze and others), they have played with and produced artists such as Madonna, Bob Dylan, Mick Jagger, The Rolling Stones, Grace Jones, Joan Armatrading, Gilberto Gil, Joe Cocker, Matisyahu, Serge Gainsbourg, Simply Red, Michael Franti, Sting, Khaled, Mey Vidal, Tricky, Doug E. Fresh, Carlos Santana, Sinéad O'Connor, Monty Alexander, Ian Dury, and others.

Sly and Robbie produced No Doubt's international hits "Hey Baby" and "Underneath It All".

They also produced some tracks for Suggs' 1996 debut solo album The Lone Ranger including the hit version of "Cecilia" featuring Louchie Lou & Michie One which sold over 500,000 copies in the UK alone and reached number 4 on the UK Singles Chart.

After 35 years together, they still toured and recorded in the 2000s, until Shakespeare's death in 2021. In early 2005, they toured with Tony Rebel and Half Pint. During the summer of 2005, they toured Europe and the UK with Bunny Rugs, lead singer for Third World. During the fall of 2005 they were on the road with Sinéad O'Connor. in August 2006, they appeared with Don Carlos at the Reggae on the River festival, and in August 2007 they performed on a tour of the Western United States and Canada along with dancehall-soul singer and actress Cherine Anderson, including headlining Reggae Rising in Humboldt County and the Hollywood Bowl. They toured with Bitty McLean, the TAXI Gang, and in 2012, planned a Jamaican Legends tour throughout Europe, with jazz pianist Monty Alexander and guitarist Ernest Ranglin.

They have produced several new Jamaican artists for their Taxi label, as well as such as Elephant Man and Buju Banton, for whom they re-used their 1982 instrumental song "Unmetered Taxi" for the number one hit "Driver A". In 2006, they recorded with their original group, the Revolutionaries, to produce Horace Andy's new album Livin' It Up and produced several hits for Cherine Anderson. In 2007, they collaborated with the Italian rapper Jovanotti on the album Safari. They also produced tracks for Paul McCartney and Britney Spears. Sly and Robbie collaborated with the Ecuadorian singer-songwriter Cecilia Villar Eljuri, on several occasions; on her song "El Aire" from her 2008 album En Paz, in 2012 on her song "Empuja" from Fuerte and in 2016 on her song "Quiero Saber" from La Lucha. Sung in Spanish, these songs quickly charted on Worldbeat and Latin Alternative international radio. Sly and Robbie worked on Brazilian singer-songwriter Vanessa da Mata's third album Sim, bringing their own feel to several tracks. Partially recorded in Kingston, Jamaica, Sim was released on 28 May 2007 by Sony BMG.

In 2009, Movin' On, the new album by Bitty McLean, which they produced with McLean and their longtime friend and associate Guillaume Bougard, came out and was widely acclaimed as the best reggae album of the year. Sly and Robbie toured Japan, Morocco (Mawazine festival) and Europe with McLean to showcase the album. Sly and Robbie produced four songs on Cherine Anderson's EP The Introduction-Dubstyle. The second single "Shine on Jamaica", which was produced by the duo, peaked at number 1 for four weeks on both the South Florida Reggae charts, as well as the WAVS 1170 Reggae Charts. In 2012, they worked on Khalifa's album G.RIOT 2012 and Bitty McLean's album. Their 2014 project, Sly and Robbie presents No-Maddz, was released at the end of 2014.

They received their 11th Grammy Award nomination in 2014 for the album The Reggae Power. In October 2015, the duo received the Gold Musgrave Medal in recognition of their contribution to music.

In 2019, they collaborated with the reggae group Roots Radics on the album The Final Battle: Roots Radics vs. Sly & Robbie, produced by Hernan "Don Camel" Sforzini. The album was nominated for a Grammy.

== Discography ==
- Language Barrier (1985)
- Rhythm Killers (1987)
- Silent Assassin (1989)
- Friends (1998)
- Drum and Bass Strip to the Bone (1999)
- Version Born (2004)
- Rhythm Doubles (2006)
- Dubrising (2014)

== Appearances in media ==
Sly and Robbie appeared in the 2011 documentary Reggae Got Soul: The Story of Toots and the Maytals which was featured on BBC and described as "The untold story of one of the most influential artists ever to come out of Jamaica".
