= Natasha Bedingfield discography =

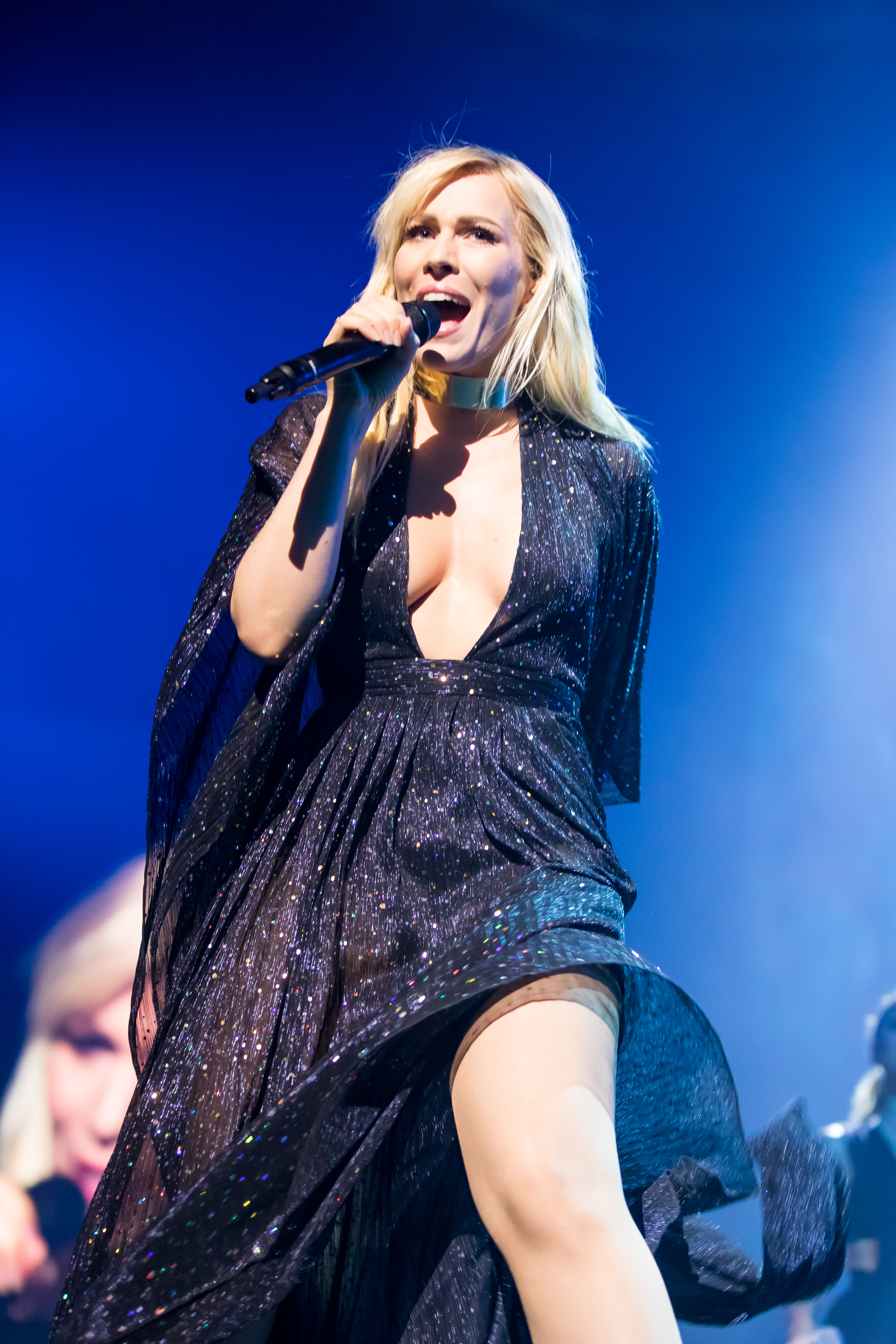
- Natasha Bedingfield performing in Germany on 25 November 2016
- Studio albums: 4
- Extended plays: 2
- Singles: 22
- Video albums: 1
- Music videos: 25

The English singer Natasha Bedingfield has released 4 studio albums, 22 singles, 25 music videos, and 1 video album.

Bedingfield's debut album, Unwritten, was released in the United Kingdom in September 2004. It produced four singles: "Single", "These Words", which peaked at number one on the UK Singles Chart, "Unwritten" and "I Bruise Easily". The album reached number one on the UK Albums Chart and was certified 3× Platinum by the British Phonographic Industry (BPI). Her second album, N.B., was released in 2007 and was less successful, but still reached number nine in the UK and produced two UK top ten singles. For the North American market, N.B. was repackaged and was released with an altered track listing under the name Pocketful of Sunshine in January 2008. The album reached number three on the US Billboard 200 and was certified Gold by the Recording Industry Association of America (RIAA). Bedingfield's third album, Strip Me, was released in the United States and Canada in December 2010. The album received similar treatment to its predecessor and was released in Europe under the title Strip Me Away in 2011. Her fourth studio album, "Roll with Me" was released in 2019 and spawned two singles. In late 2023, Bedingfield's song "Unwritten" saw an increase in popularity when it was featured in the film Anyone But You.

According to Recording Industry Association of America, Bedingfield has sold 5,5 million digital singles and 1 million albums in the United States.

== Albums ==
=== Studio albums ===
List of albums, with selected chart positions, sales, and certifications
Title	Album details	Peak chart positions										Certifications
Title	Album details	UK	AUS	AUT	CAN	GER	IRE	NLD	NZ	SWI	US	Certifications
Unwritten	Released: 6 September 2004; Label: Phonogenic, Epic; Formats: CD, digital download	1	89	31	19	20	4	16	31	23	26	BPI: 3× Platinum; BVMI: Gold; RIAA: Gold; RMNZ: 2× Platinum
N.B.	Released: 30 April 2007; Label: Phonogenic, Epic; Formats: CD, digital download	9	—	—	13	80	14	—	—	37	—	BPI: Gold
Strip Me	Released: 7 December 2010; Label: Phonogenic, Epic; Formats: CD, digital download	—	—	—	—	45	—	—	—	42	103	
Roll with Me	Released: 30 August 2019; Label: We Are Hear; Formats: CD, Digital download, streaming	—	—	—	—	—	—	—	—	—	—	
"—" denotes album that did not chart or was not released

=== Reissues ===
List of reissues, with selected chart positions, certifications and sales figures
Title	Album details	Peak chart positions		Certifications
Title	Album details	CAN	US	Certifications
Pocketful of Sunshine	Released: 22 January 2008; Label: Epic; Format: CD, digital download	13	3	MC: Gold; RIAA: Gold; RMNZ: Gold

=== Video albums ===
Title	Album details
Live in New York City	Released: 21 November 2006; Label: Sony BMG

== Extended plays ==
Title	EP details
Live in New York City	Released: 27 March 2007; Label: Phonogenic; Format: Digital download
Live from London	Released: 29 June 2007; Label: Phonogenic; Format: Digital download

== Singles ==
=== As lead artist ===
List of singles, with selected chart positions and certifications, showing year released and album name
Single	Year	Peak chart positions										Certifications	Album
Single	Year	UK	AUS	AUT	CAN	GER	IRE	NLD	NZ	SWI	US	Certifications	Album
"Single"	2004	3	78	—	—	—	7	—	—	—	57		Unwritten
"These Words"	2004	1	5	2	—	2	1	4	2	8	17	BPI: Platinum; ARIA: Platinum; RIAA: Gold; RMNZ: 2× Platinum	Unwritten
"Unwritten"	2004	6	15	18	32	5	6	5	15	4	5	BPI: 4× Platinum; ARIA: 7× Platinum; BVMI: 3× Gold; MC: Platinum; RIAA: 2× Platinum; RMNZ: 6× Platinum	Unwritten
"I Bruise Easily"	2005	12	—	46	—	46	17	13	—	53	—		Unwritten
"I Wanna Have Your Babies"	2007	7	50	50	—	39	8	23	—	100	—		N.B.
"Soulmate"	2007	7	—	7	79	12	28	24	—	7	96	BVMI: Gold	N.B.
"Love Like This" (featuring Sean Kingston)	2007	20	77	—	9	33	34	—	5	—	11	RIAA: Platinum; RMNZ: Platinum	Pocketful of Sunshine
"Pocketful of Sunshine"	2008	—	—	28	3	24	—	—	—	43	5	BPI: Platinum; BVMI: Platinum; MC: Platinum; RIAA: 2× Platinum; RMNZ: 2× Platinum	Pocketful of Sunshine
"Angel"	2008	—	—	—	41	—	—	—	—	—	63		Pocketful of Sunshine
"Bruised Water" (with Chicane)	2008	42	190	—	—	—	—	22	—	—	—		The Best of Chicane: 1996–2008
"Touch"	2010	—	—	—	60	—	—	—	—	—	—		Strip Me
"Strip Me"	2010	—	—	—	65	—	—	—	—	—	91		Strip Me
"Shake Up Christmas"	2011	—	—	45	—	92	—	25	—	—	—		Non-album singles
"Hope"	2015	—	—	—	—	—	—	—	—	—	—		Non-album singles
"Unicorn" (with Basto!)	2016	—	—	—	—	—	—	—	—	—	—		Non-album singles
"Let Go"	2017	—	—	—	68	—	—	—	—	—	—		Non-album singles
"Roller Skate"	2019	—	—	—	—	—	—	—	—	—	—		Roll with Me
"Kick It"	2019	—	—	—	—	—	—	—	—	—	—		Roll with Me
"Lighthearted"	2021	—	—	—	—	—	—	—	—	—	—		Non-album singles
"Adorable"	2021	—	—	—	—	—	—	—	—	—	—		Non-album singles
"Alibi (The Other Girl Version)" (with Ella Henderson and Rudimental)	2024	10	—	—	—	—	20	—	—	—	—		Non-album singles
"These Words" (with Badger)	2024	22	78	—	—	—	—	16	—	—	—	BPI: Gold; RMNZ: Platinum	Non-album singles
"Dot Dot Dot"	2026	—	—	—	—	—	—	—	—	—	—		Non-album singles
"—" denotes single that did not chart or was not released

=== As featured artist ===
Single	Year	Peak chart positions										Certifications	Album
Single	Year	UK	AUS	AUT	CAN	GER	IRE	NLD	NZ	SWI	US	Certifications	Album
"Just Stand Up!" (as part of Artists Stand Up to Cancer)	2008	26	39	73	10	—	11	—	19	—	11		Non-album singles
"Let Me Know" (Lloyd featuring Natasha Bedingfield)	2010	—	—	—	—	—	—	—	—	—	—		Non-album singles
"Jet Lag" (Simple Plan featuring Natasha Bedingfield)	2011	—	8	—	11	59	—	19	—	54	—	ARIA: 2× Platinum; MC: 2× Platinum	Get Your Heart On!
"Miracle" (The Dirty Tees featuring Natasha Bedingfield)	2011	—	—	—	—	—	—	—	—	—	—		Non-album single
"Easy" (Rascal Flatts featuring Natasha Bedingfield)	2011	—	—	—	—	—	—	—	—	—	43	RIAA: Platinum	Nothing Like This
"As Long as We Got Love" (Javier Colon featuring Natasha Bedingfield)	2011	—	—	—	—	—	—	—	—	—	—		Come Through for You
"Between the Raindrops" (Lifehouse featuring Natasha Bedingfield)	2012	—	—	—	16	—	—	—	—	—	79		Almería
"Forward" (Ne-Yo, Herbie Hancock, Johnny Rzeznik, Delta Rae and Natasha Bedingfield)	2012	—	—	—	—	—	—	—	—	—	—		Non-album single
"Power Games" (Stanfour featuring Natasha Bedingfield)	2015	—	—	—	—	—	—	—	—	—	—		IIII
"Love Song to the Earth" (with Paul McCartney, Jon Bon Jovi, Sheryl Crow, Fergie, Colbie Caillat, Leona Lewis, Sean Paul, Johnny Rzeznik, Krewella, Angélique Kidjo, Kelsea Ballerini, Nicole Scherzinger, Christina Grimmie, Victoria Justice & Q'orianka Kilcher)	2015	—	—	—	—	—	—	—	—	—	—		Non-album singles
"Perfect Sense" (Troy NoKA featuring Natasha Bedingfield)	2015	—	—	—	—	—	—	—	—	—	—		Non-album singles
"Love Looks Like" (Art House featuring Natasha Bedingfield)	2017	—	—	—	—	—	—	—	—	—	—		Non-album singles
"—" denotes single that did not chart or was not released

=== Promotional singles ===
List of singles, with selected chart positions and certifications, showing year released and album name
Single	Year	Peak chart positions	Album
Single	Year	US Dance	Album
"The One That Got Away"	2006	1	Unwritten
"Say It Again"	2007	—	N.B.
"—" denotes single that did not chart or was not released

== Music videos ==
Year	Title
2004	"Single"
2004	"These Words"
2004	"Unwritten"
2005	"I Bruise Easily"
2007	"I Wanna Have Your Babies"
2007	"Soulmate"
2007	"Say It Again"
2007	"Love Like This" (with Sean Kingston)
2008	"Pocketful of Sunshine"
2008	"Just Stand Up!" (with Artists Stand Up to Cancer)
2008	"Angel"
2008	"Bruised Water"
2010	"Touch"
2010	"Strip Me"
2011	"Jet Lag"
2011	"Easy" (with Rascal Flatts)
2011	"As Long as We Got Love" (with Javier Colon)
2012	"Between the Raindrops" (with Lifehouse)
2015	"Hope"
2015	"Power Games" (with Stanfour)
2017	"Let Go"
2017	"Hey Boy"
2019	"Kick It"
2020	"Together In This"
2021	"Lighthearted"

== Other appearances ==
Year	Song	Album
2002	"All I Do"	Blessed
2004	"Shout Your Fame"	Shout God's Fame
2004	"You Are My Rock"	Shout God's Fame
2004	"Centre of My Life"	Shout God's Fame
2004	"I Will Go"	Shout God's Fame
2004	"Here I Am (Father's Love)"	Shout God's Fame
2004	"Alive"	Jesus Is My Superhero
2004	"You're the One"	Jesus Is My Superhero
2004	"Do They Know It's Christmas?"	Band Aid 20
2005	"End of Time"	Open the Door
2005	"I'm a Bomb"	Miss Congeniality 2: Armed and Fabulous - Music From The Motion Picture
2005	"Natasha Beats The Devil"	Unreleasable Volume 2: 'How I Fucked Off All My Friends'
2006	"The Scientist"	Radio 1's Live Lounge
2006	"Wild Horses"	Flicka: Motion Picture Soundtrack
2007	"Ray of Light"	Radio 1. Established 1967
2007	"Chasing Cars"	Radio 1's Live Lounge – Volume 2
2007	"End of Time" (with Shenkar)	Open The Door
2007	"Lay Down"	Serve2 (Fighting Hunger & Poverty)
2008	"Just Stand Up!" (among Artists Stand Up to Cancer)	Single-only release
2009	"Again"	Confessions of a Shopaholic: Original Motion Picture Soundtrack
2009	"Yes We Can" (with the Naked Brothers Band)	Songs from Season Three
2010	"Last Chance" (with Nicki Minaj)	Pink Friday
2010	"Shoot For the Stars"	Avon Voices (Kite Records)
2011	"Recover"	SXSW4Japan
2011	"Freckles"	CARE for Haiti
2012	"Ring Them Bells"	Chimes of Freedom: Songs of Bob Dylan Honoring 50 Years of Amnesty International
2013	"Body Rock (Solarris Remix)" (Marc Vedo feat. 8 Ball & Natasha Bedingfield)	Cream Club Anthems 2013
2014	"Who I Am"	The Music From The Pirate Fairy
2014	"Crash and Burn" (with Frankmusik)	By Nicole
2016	"Help from Heaven" (with Matt Redman)	These Christmas Lights
2017	"More of Me"	Tangled: Before Ever After
2019	"The Sign"	Classic '90s Dance Vol. 3 (with Alex Christensen and The Berlin Orchestra)
2019	"Missing"	Classic '90s Dance Vol. 3 (with Alex Christensen and The Berlin Orchestra)
2020	"Together in This"	Jungle Beat: The Movie

== See also ==
- List of songs written by Natasha Bedingfield
