= List of songs written by Natasha Bedingfield =

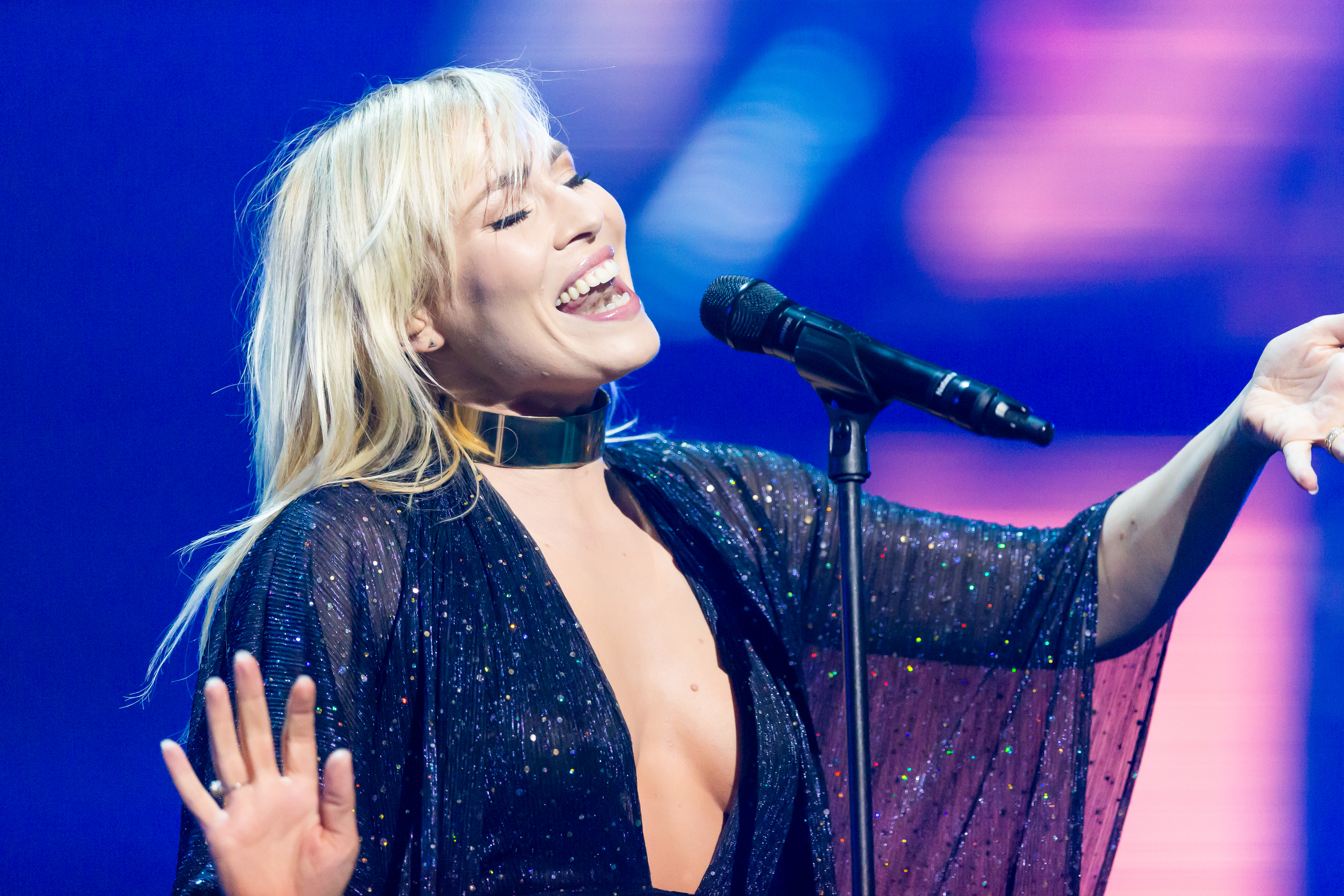
Bedingfield performing in 2016

British singer-songwriter Natasha Bedingfield has written and recorded songs for her own musical releases, as well as written numerous songs recorded by other artists.

== Released songs ==
=== Written and recorded by Bedingfield ===
Key
†	Indicates single release

List of songs written and recorded by Natasha Bedingfield
Song	Artist(s)	Writer(s)	Album	Year	Ref.(s)
"All I Need"	Natasha Bedingfield	John Shanks; Danielle Brisebois; Natasha Bedingfield; Kevin Rudolf	Strip Me	2010	
"Angel"	Natasha Bedingfield	Richard Butler; LaShawn Daniels; Rodney Jerkins; Crystal Johnson	N.B.	2008	
"Backyard"	Natasha Bedingfield	Natasha Bedingfield; Greg Kurstin	N.B.	2007	
"Break Thru"	Natasha Bedingfield	Natasha Bedingfield; Andreas Kleerup; Jonas Myrin	Strip Me	2010	
"Bruised Water"	Natasha Bedingfield	Nicholas Bracegirdle; Wayne Wilkins; Andrew Frampton; Natasha Bedingfield	Non-album song	2008	
"Can't Fall Down"	Natasha Bedingfield	Andrew Frampton; Natasha Bedingfield; Steve Kipner; Wayne Wilkins	Strip Me	2010	
"Can't Let Go"	Natasha Bedingfield	Natasha Bedingfield; Linda Perry	Roll with Me	2019	
"Can't Look Away"	Natasha Bedingfield	Natasha Bedingfield; Linda Perry	Roll with Me	2019	
"Cheer Me Up"	Natasha Bedingfield	Natasha Bedingfield; Toby Gad	Pocketful of Sunshine	2008	
"Dot Dot Dot"	Natasha Bedingfield	Natasha Bedingfield; Brett Hite		2026	
"Drop Me in the Middle"	Natasha Bedingfield	Danielle Brisebois; Natasha Bedingfield; Rufus Johnson; Wayne Rodriguez	Unwritten	2004	
"Drop Me in the Middle (featuring Estelle)"	Natasha Bedingfield	Estelle; Danielle Brisebois; Natasha Bedingfield; Wayne Rodriguez	Unwritten	2005	
"Everybody Come Together" (featuring Angel Haze)	Natasha Bedingfield	Natasha Bedingfield; Linda Perry	Roll with Me	2019	
"Freckles"	Natasha Bedingfield	Natasha Bedingfield; Toby Gad	Pocketful of Sunshine	2008	
"Frogs & Princes"	Natasha Bedingfield	Andrew Frampton; Natasha Bedingfield; Wayne Wilkins; Steve Kipner	Unwritten	2004	
"Happy"	Natasha Bedingfield	Natasha Bedingfield; Meleni Smith; Toby Gad	Pocketful of Sunshine	2008	
"Hey Boy"	Natasha Bedingfield	Natasha Bedingfield; Linda Perry	Served Like a Girl soundtrack	2017	
"Hey Papa"	Natasha Bedingfield	Natasha Bedingfield; Linda Perry	Roll with Me	2019	
"Hope"	Natasha Bedingfield	Natasha Bedingfield; Ryan Freeman; Matthew Robinson; David Saw	Non-album song	2015	
"How Do You Do"	Natasha Bedingfield	Natasha Bedingfield; Andrew Frampton; Wayne Wilkins; Steve Kipner	N.B.	2007	
"I Bruise Easily" †	Natasha Bedingfield	Andrew Frampton; Natasha Bedingfield; Wayne Wilkins; Paul Herman	Unwritten	2004	
"I Feel You"	Natasha Bedingfield	Natasha Bedingfield; Linda Perry	Roll with Me	2019	
"I Think They're Thinking (Interlude)"	Natasha Bedingfield	Natasha Bedingfield; Greg Kurstin	N.B.	2007	
"I Wanna Have Your Babies" †	Natasha Bedingfield	Natasha Bedingfield; Andrew Frampton; Wayne Wilkins; Steve Kipner	N.B.	2007	
"I'm a Bomb"	Natasha Bedingfield	Natasha Bedingfield; Andrew Frampton; Wayne Wilkins; Steve Kipner	Unwritten	2004	
"If You're Gonna..."	Natasha Bedingfield	Andrew Frampton; Natasha Bedingfield; Steve Kipner; Wayne Wilkins	Unwritten	2004	
"It Could Be Love"	Natasha Bedingfield	Natasha Bedingfield; Linda Perry; Lisa Vitale	Roll with Me	2019	
"Kick It"	Natasha Bedingfield	Natasha Bedingfield; Linda Perry	Roll with Me	2019	
"King of the World"	Natasha Bedingfield	Natasha Bedingfield; Linda Perry	Roll with Me	2019	
"Lay Down"	Natasha Bedingfield	Natasha Bedingfield; David Tench	N.B.	2007	
"Lighthearted"	Natasha Bedingfield	Natasha Bedingfield; Simon Wilcox; Wayne Wilkins	Non-album song	2021	
"Little Too Much"	Natasha Bedingfield	John Hill; Natasha Bedingfield; Jonas Myrin	Strip Me	2010	
"Love Like This (featuring Sean Kingston)" †	Natasha Bedingfield	Samuel Watters; Richard Butler; Wayne Wilkins; Ryan Tedder; Louis Biancaniello; Natasha Bedingfield	Pocketful of Sunshine	2007	
"Loved By You"	Natasha Bedingfield	Natasha Bedingfield	N.B.	2007	
"Neon Lights"	Natasha Bedingfield	Ryan Tedder; Wayne Wilkins; Natasha Bedingfield	Strip Me	2010	
"No Man I See"	Natasha Bedingfield	Natasha Bedingfield; Linda Perry	Roll with Me	2019	
"No More What Ifs"	Natasha Bedingfield	Steve Kipner; Natasha Bedingfield; Andrew Frampton; Eve Jeffers	N.B.	2007	
"No Mozart"	Natasha Bedingfield	Steve Kipner; Natasha Bedingfield; Wayne Wilkins; Andrew Frampton	Strip Me	2010	
"Not Givin' Up"	Natasha Bedingfield	Natasha Bedingfield; Steve Kipner; Nate Hills	N.B.	2007	
"The One That Got Away"	Natasha Bedingfield	Natasha Bedingfield; Andrew Frampton; Michael Tafaro; Steve Kipner; Nathan Winkler	Unwritten	2005	
"Peace of Me"	Natasha Bedingfield	Kara Dioguardi; Natasha Bedingfield; Patrick Leonard	Unwritten	2004	
"Piece of Your Heart"	Natasha Bedingfield	J.R. Rotem; Natasha Bedingfield; Danielle Brisebois	Pocketful of Sunshine	2008	
"Pirate Bones"	Natasha Bedingfield	Steve Kipner; Natasha Bedingfield; Andrew Frampton; Wayne Wilkins	N.B.	2007	
"Pocketful of Sunshine" †	Natasha Bedingfield	Natasha Bedingfield; Danielle Brisebois; John Shanks	Pocketful of Sunshine	2008	
"Put Your Arms Around Me"	Natasha Bedingfield	Natasha Bedingfield; Andrew Frampton; Wayne Wilkins; Steve Kipner	Pocketful of Sunshine	2008	
"Real Love"	Natasha Bedingfield	Natasha Bedingfield; Linda Perry	Roll with Me	2019	
"Recover"	Natasha Bedingfield	Natasha Bedingfield; Francis White	Strip Me	2010	
"Roller Skate"	Natasha Bedingfield	Natasha Bedingfield; Linda Perry	Roll with Me	2010	
"Run Run Run"	Natasha Bedingfield	John Hill; Natasha Bedingfield; Jonas Myrin	Strip Me	2010	
"Say It Again" †	Natasha Bedingfield	Natasha Bedingfield; Michael Elizondo; Adam Levine	N.B. Pocketful of Sunshine	2007–2008	
"Shoot For the Stars"	Natasha Bedingfield	Natasha Bedingfield; Toby Gad; Ryan Collins	Non-album song	2010	
"Silent Movie"	Natasha Bedingfield	Greg Chambers; Natasha Bedingfield	Unwritten	2004	
"Single" †	Natasha Bedingfield	Steve Kipner; Natasha Bedingfield; Andrew Frampton; Wayne Wilkins	Unwritten	2004	
"Size Matters"	Natasha Bedingfield	Natasha Bedingfield; Andrew Frampton; Wayne Wilkins; Steve Kipner	Unwritten	2004	
"Smell the Roses"	Natasha Bedingfield	Natasha Bedingfield; Andrew Frampton; Wayne Wilkins; Steve Kipner	N.B.	2007	
"Sojourn"	Natasha Bedingfield	Natasha Bedingfield; Nick Keynes; Michael Harwood; Jon O'Mahony	Unwritten	2004	
"Soulmate" †	Natasha Bedingfield	Mads Hauge; Natasha Bedingfield; David Tench	N.B.	2007	
"Stepping Stone"	Natasha Bedingfield	Natasha Bedingfield; Andrew Frampton; Wayne Wilkins	N.B.	2007	
"Still Here"	Natasha Bedingfield	Diane Warren	N.B.	2007	
"Strip Me" †	Natasha Bedingfield	Wayne Wilkins; Ryan Tedder; Natasha Bedingfield	Strip Me	2010	
"Stumble"	Natasha Bedingfield	Shelly Peiken; Greg Wells	Unwritten	2005	
"Sweet Nothing"	Natasha Bedingfield	Natasha Bedingfield; Linda Perry	Roll with Me	2019	
"These Words" †	Natasha Bedingfield	Andrew Frampton; Natasha Bedingfield; Wayne Wilkins; Steve Kipner	Unwritten	2004	
"Touch" †	Natasha Bedingfield	Natasha Bedingfield; Steve Kipner; Julian Bunetta	Strip Me	2010	
"Tricky Angel"	Natasha Bedingfield	Natasha Bedingfield; Wayne Wilkins; Steve Kipner	N.B.	2007	
"Try"	Natasha Bedingfield	John Shanks; Danielle Brisebois; Natasha Bedingfield	Strip Me	2010	
"Unexpected Hero"	Natasha Bedingfield	John Hill; Natasha Bedingfield; Daniel Carey	Strip Me	2010	
"Unicorn"	Basto & Natasha Bedingfield	Natasha Bedingfield; Toby Gad; Jef Martens	Non-album song	2016	
"Unwritten" †	Natasha Bedingfield	Danielle Brisebois; Wayne Rodriguez; Natasha Bedingfield	Unwritten	2004	
"We're All Mad In Our Own Way"	Natasha Bedingfield	Danielle Brisebois; Natasha Bedingfield; Nick Lashley	Unwritten	2004	
"Weightless"	Natasha Bedingfield	Wayne Wilkins; Andre Merritt; Steve Kipner; Natasha Bedingfield	Strip Me	2010	
"When U Know U Know"	Natasha Bedingfield	Danielle Brisebois; Natasha Bedingfield; Wayne Rodriguez; Zaire Black; Larry Blackmon	N.B.	2007	
"Where We Going Now"	Natasha Bedingfield	Natasha Bedingfield; Linda Perry	Roll with Me	2019	
"Who Knows"	Natasha Bedingfield	Natasha Bedingfield; Michael Elizondo	N.B.	2007	
"Wild Horses" †	Natasha Bedingfield	Andrew Frampton; Natasha Bedingfield; Wayne Wilkins	Unwritten	2004	
"Wishful Thinking"	Natasha Bedingfield	Natasha Bedingfield; Linda Perry	Roll with Me	2019	
"You Look Good On Me"	Natasha Bedingfield	Danielle Brisebois; Natasha Bedingfield; Andrew Frampton; Wayne Wilkins	Non-album song	2005	
"Your Child My Child"	Milck & Natasha Bedingfield	Connie Lim; Natasha Bedingfield; Rod Castro	Non-album song	2023	

=== Written for other artists ===
List of songs written by Natasha Bedingfield for other recording artists
Song	Artist(s)	Writer(s)	Album	Year	Ref.(s)
"Alive"	Hillsong Church	Natasha Bedingfield; Giovanni Galanti; Jonas Myrin	Jesus Is My Superhero	2005	
"All I Do"	Hillsong Church	Natasha Bedingfield; Giovanni Galanti	Blessed	2002	
"As Long as We Got Love (featuring Natasha Bedingfield)"	Javier Colon featuring Natasha Bedingfield	Natasha Bedingfield; Dave Bassett; Javier Colon; David Hodges	Come Through for You	2011	
"Away"	Tasha G	Natasha Bedingfield; Andrew Frampton; Michael Tafaro; Steve Kipner; Nathan Winkler	Non-album song	2015	
"Betcha Never"	Cherie	Natasha Bedingfield; David James; Alan Ross	Cherie	2004	
"Betcha Never"	Jennifer Rush	Natasha Bedingfield; David James; Alan Ross	Now Is the Hour	2010	
"Betcha Never"	Tata Young	Natasha Bedingfield; David James; Alan Ross	Temperature Rising	2007	
"Black Sky"	Kimbra	Natasha Bedingfield; Matt Robinson; David Saw; Kimbra	Primal Heart	2018	
"Centre of My Life"	Hillsong Church	Natasha Bedingfield; Jonas Myrin	Shout God's Fame	2006	
"Crash and Burn (featuring Natasha Bedingfield)"	Frankmusik featuring Natasha Bedingfield	Natasha Bedingfield; Vincent Turner	By Nicole	2014	
"Electric Love"	Gina Star & Poet feat. Golden Phoenix	Natasha Bedingfield; James Hurr; Jaime Munson; Laura Wilson	Non-album song	2013	
"Faith"	Marisha Wallace	Natasha Bedingfield; Toby Gad	Tomorrow	2020	
"Fall"	Brandy	Brian Seals; Natasha Bedingfield; LaShawn Daniels; Brandy Norwood	Human	2008	
"Gather Round"	Band of Merrymakers	Natasha Bedingfield; Kevin Griffin; Sam Hollander	Welcome to Our Christmas Party	2015	
"Help from Heaven (featuring Natasha Bedingfield"	Matt Redman	Natasha Bedingfield; Jonas Myrin; Matt Redman	These Christmas Lights	2016	
"Here I Am (Fathers Love)"	Hillsong Church	Natasha Bedingfield; Jonas Myrin	Shout God's Fame	2006	
"Hold Me in Your Arms"	H & Claire	Daniel Bedingfield; Natasha Bedingfield; Nathan Winkler	Non-album song	2002	
"I Spy"	Erica Baxter	Natasha Bedingfield; Kevin Hughes	Through My Eyes	2007	
"I Will Go"	Hillsong Church	Natasha Bedingfield; Jonas Myrin	Shout God's Fame	2006	
"Incompatible"	Omar	Natasha Bedingfield; Michael Calpito; Omar Kadir	Non-album song	2010	
"Kiss of Life"	The Corrs	Natasha Bedingfield; John Shanks; The Corrs	White Light	2015	
"Last Chance (featuring Natasha Bedingfield)"	Nicki Minaj featuring Natasha Bedingfield	Natasha Bedingfield; Onika Maraj; Andrew Thielk	Pink Friday	2010	
"Let Me Take You"	KI	Natasha Bedingfield; Isaac Butcher; Kelli-Leigh	Non-album song	2011	
"Lighthouse"	Charice	Natasha Bedingfield; Danielle Brisebois; Michael Elizondo	Infinity	2011	
"Love Looks Like"	Art House & Natasha Bedingfield	Natasha Bedingfield; Jonas Myrin; Julio Reyes		2017	
"Love Made Me Do It"	Cheryl	Natasha Bedingfield; The Invisible Men; Cheryl; Dylan Cooper; Nicola Roberts; Miranda Cooper; Kylie Minogue		2018	
"Love Song to the Earth (Keep It Safe)"	Paul McCartney, Jon Bon Jovi, Sheryl Crow, Fergie, Colbie Caillat, Natasha Bedingfield, Leona Lewis, Sean Paul, Johnny Rzeznik, Krewella, Angélique Kidjo, Kelsea Ballerini, Nicole Scherzinger, Christina Grimmie, Victoria Justice & Q'orianka Kilcher	Natasha Bedingfield; Toby Gad; John Shanks; Sean Paul	Non-album song	2015	
"Love the Way I Do"	Carly Simon	Natasha Bedingfield; Carly Simon; Jacob Brackman; Teese Gohl; David Saw; Ben Taylor	Comes in Waves	2026	
"Non Mi Ami"	Giorgia	Natasha Bedingfield; Fraser T Smith; Giorgia Todrani	Fearless	2014	
"Only Wanna Dance With You"	Zac Tenenbaum featuring Ásdís	Natasha Bedingfield; Marcus Brosch; Cara Onofrio; Jones Shandel; Ásdís	Fearless	2014	
"Power Games (featuring Natasha Bedingfield)"	Stanfour featuring Natasha Bedingfield	Natasha Bedingfield; Fraser T Smith	IIII	2015	
"Qui Parle D'elles"	Chimène Badi	Natasha Bedingfield; Arolld El-Baze; Fraser T Smith	Au-delà des maux	2015	
"Second Wind"	Nick Carter	Natasha Bedingfield; Nick Carter; Dan Muckala; Thomas Williams	All American	2015	
"Shout Your Fame"	Hillsong Church	Natasha Bedingfield; Giovanni Galanti; Jonas Myrin; Paul Nevison	Hope	2003	
"The Weekend"	Chris Stills	Natasha Bedingfield; David Saw; Chris Stills	Don't Be Afraid	2018	
"Wishlist"	Band of Merrymakers	Natasha Bedingfield; Kevin Griffin; Sam Hollander	Welcome to Our Christmas Party	2015	
"You Are My Rock (2)"	Hillsong Church	Natasha Bedingfield; Giovanni Galanti	Shout God's Fame	2006	
"You Lift Me Up"	Louise Hayes	Natasha Bedingfield; Jonas Myrin	Next Step	2010	
"You're the One"	Hillsong Church	Natasha Bedingfield; Giovanni Galanti	Jesus Is My Superhero	2005	

== Unreleased songs ==
List of unreleased songs written or recorded by Natasha Bedingfield
Song	Artist(s)	Writer(s)	Ref.(s)
"40 Ways"	Natasha Bedingfield	Wayne Rodrigues; Danielle Brisebois; Natasha Bedingfield	
"After All"	Natasha Bedingfield	Natasha Bedingfield; Ryan Freeman; Matthew Robinson; David Saw	
"All I See Is You"		Danielle Brisebois; Natasha Bedingfield; John Shanks	
"Anyone Else"	Natasha Bedingfield	J.R. Rotem; Natasha Bedingfield; Steve Kipner	
"Are You Gonna Love Me"		Natasha Bedingfield; Christa Black; Jonas Myrin	
"Back From Beyond"		Natasha Bedingfield; Shridhar Solanki; Wayne Wilkins	
"Best Summer" a.k.a. "Our Summer"	Natasha Bedingfield	Natasha Bedingfield; Toby Gad; Novel	
"Bigger Picture"	Natasha Bedingfield	Natasha Bedingfield; Felix Howard; Peter-John Vettese	
"Born Too Soon"		Wayne Wilkins; Steve Kipner; Andrew Frampton; Natasha Bedingfield	
"Bring Me Back"	Natasha Bedingfield		
"Can't Get Away"	Natasha Bedingfield	J.R. Rotem; Natasha Bedingfield	
"Can't Shake It Off"	Colbie Caillat	Natasha Bedingfield; Colbie Caillat; Toby Gad	
"Can't Turn This Off"		Natasha Bedingfield; Andrew Frampton; Steve Kipner; Dean Sharpe	
"Change Me"		Natasha Bedingfield; Jonas Myrin	
"A Child's Eyes"	Natasha Bedingfield	Natasha Bedingfield; Danielle Brisebois; Michael Elizondo	
"Circles"		Natasha Bedingfield; David Saw; Matt Robinson; Ryan Freeman	
"Cool"	Natasha Bedingfield	Natasha Bedingfield; Joy Deb; Linnea Deb; Björn Djupström	
"Corridors"		Natasha Bedingfield; David Saw; Matt Robinson	
"Couldn't Stop If I Tried"	Natasha Bedingfield	Wayne Wilkins; Steve Kipner; Andrew Frampton; Natasha Bedingfield	
"Cracks (When You Come Close)"		Natasha Bedingfield; Camille Purcell; Fraser T. Smith	
"Crystal Ball"		Natasha Bedingfield; David Saw; Matt Robinson	
"Cupid"	Natasha Bedingfield	Lester Mendez; Nina Woodford	
"D.I.Y. (Do It Yourself)"	Natasha Bedingfield	Michael Elizondo; Natasha Bedingfield; Jeff Trott	
"Dark Sky"		Natasha Bedingfield; Kimbra; David Saw; Matt Robinson	
"Die Hard"		Natasha Bedingfield; Stuart Crichton; Benjamin McIldowie	
"Differently"		Natasha Bedingfield; Tom Craskey; Dave Tozer	
"Do What Makes You Happy"	Natasha Bedingfield	Natasha Bedingfield; Toby Gad; Jef Martens	
"Domino"		Natasha Bedingfield; David Saw; Matt Robinson	
"Don't Go Away"		Natasha Bedingfield; Jonas Myrin	
"Don't Pretend"		Natasha Bedingfield; Simon Hill; Nicholas Nigel Battle	
"Dream Big"		Natasha Bedingfield; Toby Gad	
"Drop Me in the Middle (Original Version)"	Natasha Bedingfield	Wayne Rodrigues; Natasha Bedingfield; Danielle Brisebois	
"Elementary"		Natasha Bedingfield; Dele Ladimeji	
"Elevate"		Natasha Bedingfield; Andrew Frampton; Steve Kipner; Mark Stent; Wayne Wilkins	
"Everything Changes"	Natasha Bedingfield	Natasha Bedingfield; Francis White	
"First Heartbreak"	Natasha Bedingfield	Tori Kelly; Toby Gad	
"Girl Like Me"		Natasha Bedingfield; Vincent D'Annunzio; Cara Onofrio; Tony Rodini	
"God, A Conversation"	Natasha Bedingfield	Natasha Bedingfield; Toby Gad; Meleni Smith	
"Guys Cannot Be Friends With Girls"	Natasha Bedingfield	Steve Kipner; Andrew Frampton; Wayne Wilkins; Natasha Bedingfield	
"Happen To Be Happy"		Natasha Bedingfield; Naughty Boy	
"Hardest Part"		Natasha Bedingfield; Gregg Alexander; Danielle Brisebois; Jimmy Hogarth	
"Heart Like a Rose"		Natasha Bedingfield; David Ryan Harris	
"Helpless"		Natasha Bedingfield; Jonathan Quarmby; David Saw	
"Here I Am"	Natasha Bedingfield	Alex Brown; Ali Tennant; Wayne Wilkins	
"Hold You In My Heart"		Natasha Bedingfield; Jonas Myrin	
"Honestly"		Natasha Bedingfield; Martin Brammer; Steve Robson	
"I Can't Hear You"		Natasha Bedingfield; Dele Ladimeji	
"I Don't Want To Need"		Natasha Bedingfield; Darrell Brown; François Tétaz	
"I Hate Love"		Natasha Bedingfield; Danielle Brisebois; Julian Bunetta	
"I Like You"	Natasha Bedingfield	Natasha Bedingfield; Eric Appapoulay; David McEwan; Richard Cassell	
"I'll Be There"		Natasha Bedingfield; Danielle Brisebois; Michael Elizondo	
"In God's Hands"	Natasha Bedingfield	Natasha Bedingfield; Danielle Brisebois; Nick Lashley; Wayne Rodrigues	
"In My Imagination"	Natasha Bedingfield	Natasha Bedingfield; Michael Mobley; Brian Seals	
"It's Your Move (Make Your Move)"		Natasha Bedingfield; Johann Deterville; Yaakov Gruzman; Kardinal Offishall; Verse Simmonds	
"Just Wanna Be Your Girl"	Natasha Bedingfield	Natasha Bedingfield; Andrew Frampton; Steve Kipner; Wayne Wilkins	
"Keeper"	Natasha Bedingfield	Natasha Bedingfield; Greg Kurstin	
"Killing Time"		Natasha Bedingfield; Andrew Frampton; Steve Kipner	
"Let It"		Natasha Bedingfield; Darrell Brown	
"Life of the Party"		Natasha Bedingfield; Peter Kvint; Jonas Myrin	
"Life Is Getting Good"		Natasha Bedingfield; Harrison Kipner; David Saw; Matt Robinson	
"Lifeline"		Natasha Bedingfield; Giovanni Galanti	
"Lift Me Up"		Natasha Bedingfield; Jonas Myrin	
"Lipstick on the Microphone"		Natasha Bedingfield; Danielle Brisebois; Michael Elizondo	
"Little Blue Planet"	Natasha Bedingfield	Natasha Bedingfield; Andrew Frampton; Steve Kipner; Wayne Wilkins	
"The Little Things"	Natasha Bedingfield featuring Ne-Yo		
"Lottery"	Natasha Bedingfield	Natasha Bedingfield; Julian Bunetta; Andrew Frampton; Steve Kipner	
"Me Around You"	Natasha Bedingfield	Natasha Bedingfield; Toby Gad	
"Mona Lisa's Smile"		Natasha Bedingfield; Marcus Brosch; Florian Buba; Cara Onofrio	
"More Than Half of Me"	Natasha Bedingfield	Natasha Bedingfield; Toby Gad; Ryan Collins	
"My Bad"		Natasha Bedingfield; Richard Frenneaux; Laura Welsh	
"My Heart"		Natasha Bedingfield; Colbie Caillat; Toby Gad	
"My Love (Dando Te Mi Amor)"	Prince Royce	Natasha Bedingfield; Geoffrey Rojas; Toby Gad	
"Never Been Better"	Natasha Bedingfield	Natasha Bedingfield; Johannes Kjeller	
"Nothing Ever Happened"		Natasha Bedingfield; Marcus Brosch; Billy Mann	
"Off My Shoulder"		Natasha Bedingfield; XSDTRK; Jessie Reyez; Mike Wise	
"One One Day"		Natasha Bedingfield; Linnea Deb; Anton Hård af Segerstad	
"Ordinary"		Natasha Bedingfield; Björn Djupström; Tobias Frelin	
"Out in the Open"		Iain Archer; Natasha Bedingfield; Jonas Myrin	
"Party Bus"	Natasha Bedingfield	Natasha Bedingfield; Linda Perry	
"PDA"		Natasha Bedingfield; Jonas Myrin; Peter Kvint	
"Penny to Fall"		Natasha Bedingfield; David Saw; Matt Robinson	
"Picture of Tomorrow"		Natasha Bedingfield; Jonas Myrin	
"Pity Party"		Natasha Bedingfield; Michael Elizondo; Steve Kipner	
"Prisoner"	Natasha Bedingfield	Rick Nowels; Natasha Bedingfield	
"Red Light (Wake Up)"		Natasha Bedingfield; John Legend; Dave Tozer	
"Remedy"		Natasha Bedingfield; David Ryan Harris; David Hodges	
"Remote"	Natasha Bedingfield	Andrew Frampton; Crystal Johnson; Wayne Wilkins	
"Right There"	Natasha Bedingfield	Alex Brown; Emily Friendship; Wayne Wilkins	
"Rocket Science"		Natasha Bedingfield; Michael Elizondo	
"Rubber Ball"	Colbie Caillat	Natasha Bedingfield; Toby Gad	
"Satisfy"		Natasha Bedingfield; David Ryan Harris; David Hodges	
"Save My Love"	Natasha Bedingfield		
"Searching For a Song"		Natasha Bedingfield; Danielle Brisebois	
"Separation"		Natasha Bedingfield; Andreas Kleerup	
"Shine"		Natasha Bedingfield; Andrew Frampton; Steve Kipner; Wayne Wilkins	
"Should'a Known Better"		Natasha Bedingfield; David James; Alan Ross	
"Show Me What You're Working With"	Natasha Bedingfield	Natasha Bedingfield; Danielle Brisebois; John Shanks	
"Show You"		Natasha Bedingfield; Jonas Myrin	
"So Close"	featuring Sohn	Natasha Bedingfield; Sohn; Daniel Rothman	
"Speak Louder"		Natasha Bedingfield; Nikola Bedingfield; Mark Silvertongue; Delle Silvertongue	
"Speechless"	Natasha Bedingfield		
"Stars"		Natasha Bedingfield; Danielle Brisebois; Michael Elizondo	
"Stars and Moon"		Natasha Bedingfield; David Saw; Matt Robinson	
"Stick 'em Up" / "Put Your Hands in the Air" / "No Limitations"		Natasha Bedingfield; Nikola Bedingfield; Ian Barter	
"Stop Loving You"		Natasha Bedingfield; Danielle Brisebois; Julian Bunetta; Naughty Boy	
"Stronghold Diamonds"		Natasha Bedingfield; Iain Archer; Jonas Myrin	
"Superhero"	Natasha Bedingfield	Michael Elizondo; Natasha Bedingfield; Trevor Lawrence	
"Supernatural Lover"		Natasha Bedingfield; Steve Hart; Ricky Wilde	
"Ten To Zero"	Natasha Bedingfield	Natasha Bedingfield; Linda Perry	
"The One Thing I Like About You Is Everything"	Natasha Bedingfield	Eric Appapoulay; Natasha Bedingfield	
"There Is a Place"	Natasha Bedingfield	Paul Iannuzzelli; Natasha Bedingfield	
"Time Machine"		Iain Archer; Natasha Bedingfield; Peter Kvint; Jonas Myrin	
"Top Down" a.k.a. "Next Round"	Natasha Bedingfield featuring Nicki Minaj	Natasha Bedingfield; Andrew Frampton; Steve Kipner; Wayne Wilkins	
"Try to Say Goodbye"		Natasha Bedingfield; Vincent D'Annunzio; Cara Onofrio; Tony Rodini	
"Tug of War"		Natasha Bedingfield; Kimbra; David Saw; Matt Robinson	
"Unafraid"		Natasha Bedingfield; Alexander Knolle; Billy Mann	
"Under the Influence"		Natasha Bedingfield; Colton Avery; James Barry	
"Undo"		Natasha Bedingfield; Jef Martens	
"Unsaid"		Natasha Bedingfield; CJ Baran; Riley Bell; Matthew Burnett; Steph Jones	
"Used To"		Natasha Bedingfield; XSDTRK; Jessie Reyez; Mike Wise	
"Way"		Natasha Bedingfield; Danielle Brisebois; Wayne Rodrigues	
"Walking on Air"		Natasha Bedingfield; Danielle Brisebois; Michael Elizondo	
"Welcome Home"		Natasha Bedingfield; Iain Archer; Jonas Myrin	
"What Do You Want?"		Natasha Bedingfield; Danielle Brisebois; Michael Elizondo	
"What Ifs (Original Version)"	Natasha Bedingfield	Andrew Frampton; Natasha Bedingfield; Steve Kipner	
"Why Me (Believe in You)"		Natasha Bedingfield; Michael Tafaro; Nathan Winkler	
"You Won Me Over"	Natasha Bedingfield	Kevin Rudolf; Natasha Bedingfield	
"You Won Me Over"	J Kash	Jacob Kasher; Kevin Rudolf; Natasha Bedingfield	
"You're Welcome"	Natasha Bedingfield	Liam O'Donnell; Carl Ryden; Natasha Bedingfield	
