= Live in New York City (Natasha Bedingfield video) =

Video by Natasha Bedingfield
- Released: 21 November 2006
- Recorded: 8 June 2006
- Venue: Nokia Theatre Times Square (New York City, New York, United States)
- Genre: Pop; rock; R&B
- Label: Sony BMG

Live in New York City is a DVD by British pop singer Natasha Bedingfield, released on 21 November 2006. The DVD features her concert at the Nokia Theatre Times Square in New York City on 8 June 2006.

== Track listing ==
1. "If You're Gonna..."
2. "Frogs and Princes"
3. "These Words"
4. "We're all Mad"
5. "I Bruise Easily"
6. "Drop Me in the Middle" / "I'm a Bomb"
7. "Peace of Me"
8. "The Scientist"
9. "Size Matters"
10. "Silent Movie"
11. "Single"
12. "Wild Horses"
13. "Unwritten"
