= List of best-selling singles and albums of 2009 in Ireland =

This is a list of the best selling singles, albums and as according to IRMA. Further listings can be found here.

== Top-selling singles ==
1. "The Climb" – Joe McElderry
2. "I Gotta Feeling" – The Black Eyed Peas
3. "Poker Face" – Lady Gaga
4. "Just Dance" – Lady Gaga featuring Colby O'Donis
5. "Fight for This Love" – Cheryl Cole
6. "Meet Me Halfway" – The Black Eyed Peas
7. "Hallelujah" – Alexandra Burke
8. "Bad Boys" – Alexandra Burke featuring Flo Rida
9. "Broken Strings" – James Morrison featuring Nelly Furtado
10. "Bad Romance" – Lady Gaga

== Top-selling albums ==
1. I Dreamed a Dream – Susan Boyle
2. Crazy Love – Michael Bublé
3. The Fame/The Fame Monster – Lady Gaga
4. I Am... Sasha Fierce – Beyoncé
5. The E.N.D. – The Black Eyed Peas
6. No Line on the Horizon – U2
7. Where We Are – Westlife
8. Sunny Side Up – Paolo Nutini
9. The Script – The Script
10. Only by the Night – Kings of Leon

Notes:

- *Compilation albums are not included.
