= The One That Got Away (Natasha Bedingfield song) =

Promotional single by Natasha Bedingfield

from the album Unwritten
- Released: 5 May 2006
- Genre: Dance-pop; R&B
- Length: 4:05
- Label: Phonogenic
- Songwriter(s): Nathan Winkler; Natasha Bedingfield; Steve Kipner; Andrew Frampton; Michael Tafaro
- Producer(s): Kipner; Tafaro; Winkler; Peter Wade

"The One That Got Away" is a song written by Nathan Winkler, Natasha Bedingfield, Steve Kipner, Andrew Frampton and Michael Tafaro for Bedingfield's 2005 North American debut album Unwritten. The song was backed by remixes by Wamdue and Valentin, was released as a promotional single in the United States in May 2006. The song was released in the United Kingdom as a B-side to "These Words" (2004).

In the United States, the track topped the Billboard Hot Dance Club Play chart and reached number four on the Hot Dance Airplay chart.

== Formats and track listings ==
These are the formats and track listings of major single releases of "The One That Got Away".

CD single one

1. "The One That Got Away" (Valentin Radio Mix) – 3:46
2. "The One That Got Away" (Valentin Club Mix) – 6:40
3. "The One That Got Away" (Valentin MixShow Mix) – 6:05

CD single two

1. "The One That Got Away" (Wamdue Pop Mix) – 4:55
2. "The One That Got Away" (Wamdue Get Together Extended Vocal Mix) – 9:38
3. "The One That Got Away" (Wamdue Get Together Dub) – 6:40
4. "The One That Got Away" (Wamdue Get Together Radio Mix) – 5:22

Vinyl single

1. "The One That Got Away" (Wamdue Pop Rocks Mix) – 4:55
2. "The One That Got Away" (Wamdue Get Together Dub) – 6:40
3. "The One That Got Away" (Wamdue Get Together Extended Vocal Mix) – 9:38

== Personnel ==
The following people contributed to "The One That Got Away":

- Natasha Bedingfield – lead and backing vocals
- Wayne Wilkins – audio engineering
- Peter Wade Keusch, John Hill – producer, mixing
- Rob Kinelski – mixing assistant
- Herb Powers, James Cruz – mastering

== Charts ==
=== Weekly charts ===
Weekly chart performance for "The One That Got Away"
Chart (2006)	Peak position
US Dance Club Songs (Billboard)	1
US Dance/Mix Show Airplay (Billboard)	4

_{*} Wamdue & Valentin mix

=== Year-end charts ===
Year-end chart performance for "The One That Got Away"
Chart (2006)	Position
US Dance Club Songs (Billboard)	33
