= The Man Who Can't Be Moved =

2008 single by the Script

Single by The Script

from the album The Script
- B-side: "Anybody There"
- Released: 25 July 2008
- Genre: Pop rock
- Length: 4:01
- Label: RCA; Phonogenic
- Songwriters: Mark Sheehan; Danny O'Donoghue; Steve Kipner; Andrew Frampton

The Script singles chronology
"We Cry" (2008)	"The Man Who Can't Be Moved" (2008)	"Breakeven" (2008)

Audio sample
- file; help

"The Man Who Can't Be Moved" is the second single from Irish pop rock band the Script from their debut album, The Script. The song was released on 25 July 2008. The song was used heavily in the CBS show Ghost Whisperer during its fourth season. This song served as their radio promotional single in the United States, gaining airplay on multiple radio stations. On 8 June 2009, the song was released as the second official single in the United States. The song was chosen as one of the soundtracks for the 2009 Victoria's Secret Fashion Show. This song has been covered by the American a cappella group Straight No Chaser.

== Chart performance ==
On 27 July 2008, the song entered the UK Singles Chart at number 30, eventually peaking at number 2, narrowly losing the top spot to Katy Perry's "I Kissed a Girl". On its third week on the chart, the song moved up from 72 to number 19 in New Zealand. On 3 November 2008, "The Man Who Can't Be Moved" debuted at number 93 on the Australia ARIA Singles Chart, eventually peaking at number 44 and being certified Gold indicating sales of 35,000. On the Billboard Hot 100 chart, it debuted on number 96, making it Script's second single to enter the chart after "Breakeven". On 19 September 2010, "The Man Who Can't Be Moved" re-entered the UK Singles Chart at number 35 following the release of second studio album, Science & Faith, which reached number 1 in the UK Albums Chart. It has been certified gold by the RIAA for shipment of 500,000 copies in the US. Although it only reached number 86 in the chart, it has received slow burning popularity in the US. On 15 April 2012, The Man Who Can't Be Moved re-entered the UK Singles Chart at number 18 following the cover performance by David Julien on The Voice UK.

== Music video ==
The video was directed by Marc Klasfeld. It was released on the band's YouTube channel and other music channels. The video is quite similar to that of the band's debut single "We Cry" in the sense that Danny is once again walking around an urban city (in this case, Downtown Los Angeles) and there are also shots of the full band together, in a parking lot this time rather than the flat in "We Cry". However, it is different because there is a more apparent plot in this video. Danny is sitting on the pavement patiently singing about how he is waiting for a girl to come and meet him. Crowds begin to gather round him and he makes the news, becoming something of a celebrity. Near the end of the video there are time lapsed scenes of days passing with Danny in the rain and snow, growing older with a larger beard but still waiting on the pavement. The video ends with a close-up on Danny, who is still waiting as the girl has yet to come to him.

== Live performances ==
As a support act for U2 on the third concert of their 360° Tour at Croke Park, the band included this song in their set.

== Copyright infringement lawsuit ==
In May 2018, the Script filed a copyright infringement lawsuit against British singer James Arthur, claiming that Arthur's 2016 single "Say You Won't Let Go" sounded similar to "The Man Who Can't Be Moved". The lawsuit was settled in December 2018 on unknown terms, but it was announced afterwards that Danny O'Donoghue and Mark Sheehan, the writers of "The Man Who Can't Be Moved", had each officially received a co-writing credit for "Say You Won't Let Go". When the Script filed the suit, Arthur reacted negatively, calling the band "jealous" and "snakes", and saying that they would "never see a single flipping dime of mine [in requested royalties]." However, the Script did not comment on Arthur's reaction.

== Track listings ==
- CD single and digital single
1. "The Man Who Can't Be Moved" – 4:02
2. "Anybody There" – 2:57
- German CD single
1. "The Man Who Can't Be Moved" – 4:02
2. "Anybody There" – 2:57
3. "Rusty Halo" (Live at Shepherd's Bush Empire) – 3:45
4. "The Man Who Can't Be Moved" (Making of the Video) – 3:00
- Digital EP
1. "The Man Who Can't Be Moved" – 4:01
2. "The Man Who Can't Be Moved" (music video) – 3:59

== Charts ==
=== Weekly charts ===
Chart (2008–2010)	Peak position
Australia (ARIA)	44
Austria (Ö3 Austria Top 40)	33
Belgium (Ultratop 50 Flanders)	35
Belgium (Ultratip Bubbling Under Wallonia)	3
Denmark (Tracklisten)	2
Europe (Eurochart Hot 100)	8
Germany (GfK)	28
Ireland (IRMA)	2
Israel International Airplay (Media Forest)	2
Japan Hot 100 (Billboard)	4
Netherlands (Dutch Top 40)	19
Netherlands (Single Top 100)	50
New Zealand (Recorded Music NZ)	19
Scottish Singles Sales (Official Charts)	9
Slovakia Airplay (ČNS IFPI)	71
Spain (Promusicae)	49
Sweden (Sverigetopplistan)	28
Switzerland (Schweizer Hitparade)	17
UK Singles (Official Charts)	2
US Billboard Hot 100	86
US Adult Alternative Airplay (Billboard)	17
US Adult Pop Airplay (Billboard)	15
US Pop Airplay (Billboard)	27

Chart (2012)	Peak position
UK Singles (Official Charts)	18

Chart (2014)	Position
France (SNEP)	103

Chart (2025–2026)	Position
Indonesia (Billboard)	20
Malaysia International (RIM)	20
Philippines (IFPI)	12
Philippines (Philippines Hot 100)	14

=== Year-end charts ===
Chart (2008)	Position
Europe (Eurochart Hot 100)	63
Ireland (IRMA)	14
UK Singles (OCC)	28

Chart (2009)	Position
UK Singles (OCC)	182
US Adult Top 40 (Billboard)	44

Chart (2012)	Position
UK Singles (OCC)	144

Chart (2024)	Position
Philippines Hot 100	30

Chart (2025)	Position
Philippines Hot 100	20

=== All-time charts ===
Chart	Position
UK Download (OCC)	98
UK Rock Download (OCC)	14

== Certifications ==
Region	Certification	Certified units/sales
Australia (ARIA)	2× Platinum	140,000^{‡}
Denmark (IFPI Danmark)	2× Platinum	180,000^{‡}
Germany (BVMI)	Gold	150,000^{‡}
Italy (FIMI)	Gold	25,000^{‡}
New Zealand (RMNZ)	4× Platinum	120,000^{‡}
Spain (Promusicae)	Gold	30,000^{‡}
United Kingdom (BPI)	5× Platinum	3,000,000^{‡}
United States (RIAA)	Platinum	1,000,000^{‡}
Streaming
Denmark (IFPI Danmark)	Gold	900,000^{†}
^{‡} Sales+streaming figures based on certification alone.^{†} Streaming-only figures based on certification alone.

== Release history ==
Release dates and formats for "The Man Who Can't Be Moved"
Region	Date	Format	Label(s)	Ref.
United States	June 8, 2010	Mainstream airplay	Epic	
