= Hail to the King =

Hail to the King may refer to:

- A catchphrase used by Ash Williams from the Evil Dead franchise
- A catchphrase used by Duke Nukem in his namesake video game series
- Evil Dead: Hail to the King, a video game sequel to the Evil Dead film Army of Darkness
- Hail to the King (Avenged Sevenfold album), 2013
- "Hail to the King" (song), a song by metal band Avenged Sevenfold, 2013
- Hail to the King Tour
- Hail to the King (Hillsong London album), 2008
