= Unwritten (song) =

2004 single by Natasha Bedingfield

- Two-track single cover

Single by Natasha Bedingfield

from the album Unwritten
- B-side: "Wild Horses"; "The Scientist"; "If You're Gonna Jump"
- Released: 29 November 2004
- Length: 4:18 (UK album version); 4:16 (US album version); 3:39 (international radio edit); 3:52 (US radio edit)
- Label: Phonogenic
- Songwriters: Natasha Bedingfield; Danielle Brisebois; Wayne Rodrigues
- Producers: Wayne Rodrigues; Danielle Brisebois

Natasha Bedingfield singles chronology
"These Words" (2004)	"Unwritten" (2004)	"I Bruise Easily" (2005)

Music videos
- "Unwritten" on YouTube; "Unwritten" (US version) on YouTube

"Unwritten" is a song performed by English singer Natasha Bedingfield for her debut studio album of the same name. It was released on 29 November 2004 as the third single from the album. The song was written by Bedingfield, Danielle Brisebois, and Wayne Rodrigues and produced by Rodrigues and Brisebois. The single was released as the album's third UK single and second US single. In 2006, "Unwritten" became the theme song for the MTV reality television series The Hills.

"Unwritten" peaked at number six on the UK Singles Chart and is Bedingfield's most successful single in the United States, along with "Pocketful of Sunshine"; both songs peaked at number five on the US Billboard Hot 100 chart. On US radio, "Unwritten" was one of the most played songs during 2006, and its single was certified double platinum in the US. Additionally, "Unwritten" was met with critical acclaim and industry recognition, with critics praising the composition and positive lyrics. At the 49th Grammy Awards, "Unwritten" was nominated for Best Female Pop Vocal Performance.

== Background and composition ==
This song is written in the key of F Mixolydian, a mode of B-flat major in which F is used as the tonic note. The song was recorded in Venice Beach, California.

== Music videos ==
Two different music videos were made to promote the song: one was shot in 2004 in the UK for international release; the other one was shot in New York in 2005 for release in North America. Both versions received airplay in Latin America.

=== Original version ===
The original version of the video, directed by Michael Gracey, shows Bedingfield as the cover of a small animated book in a large library as it climbs an amazingly large bookshelf. As it gets higher, the shelf becomes more like a cliff, even snowing at the top. At the top, the book sees a dove and falls off. As the small book is torn apart in the fall, people pick up the pages and look up into the sky. The video may be seen to elaborate the lyric as an oblique spiritual narrative of striving to ascend (and reach a heavenly dove), while the lyric also reflects Bedingfield's concerns at this time with the process of writing, concerns perhaps more clearly expressed in "These Words", also featured on the Unwritten album.

=== North American version ===
The North American version, directed by Chris Applebaum, shows Bedingfield in an elevator. As the elevator stops at each floor, she experiences different things, including running into a park from the elevator where she sings to the camera as the sun shines brightly behind her, comforting a crying woman who kisses the wall of the elevator with red lipstick before she leaves, dancing on a street with a group of children as they are sprayed by water, watching a janitor throw away his money and watches, singing with a church choir, standing next to a couple kissing madly, and finding a potential romance with a man (portrayed by Keith Carhill) who enters the elevator and follows her after she exits.

According to a TRL interview, Bedingfield chose to make the scene where she gets wet because it was a very hot and sunny day while filming the North American version of her "These Words" video in Rio de Janeiro. This scene occurs during the second chorus.

== Reception ==
=== Critical reception ===
Reviews of "Unwritten" were generally positive, especially regarding the lyrics and production. For Allmusic, Johnny Loftus called the song a "bubblingly positive title track". For BBC Music, David Hooper commented: "A Trumpton-like acoustic guitar permeates the marvellously uplifting title track 'Unwritten', with more of those fabulous harmonies and a gospel choir added in for good effect." MusicOMH critic David Welsh wrote that the song showed Bedingfield to have "an uncanny knack for the hooky chorus." Adrien Begrand of PopMatters praised the song as "downright joyous, buoyed by a lilting acoustic guitar and a sing-along chorus". Bill Lamb of About.com called the song "a rousing general statement about developing a positive self image".

Virgin Media, in contrast, had a more mixed review, suggesting similarity to Alanis Morissette and concluding: "It may sound like something from the self-help section, but it's a relief to discover that the cliches are kept to a minimum."

In 2020, Rolling Stone ranked "Unwritten" no. 13 out of 20 "graduation songs" since the 1990s for having "an inspiring gospel-choir refrain about the wide-open potential of the future."

=== Commercial performance ===
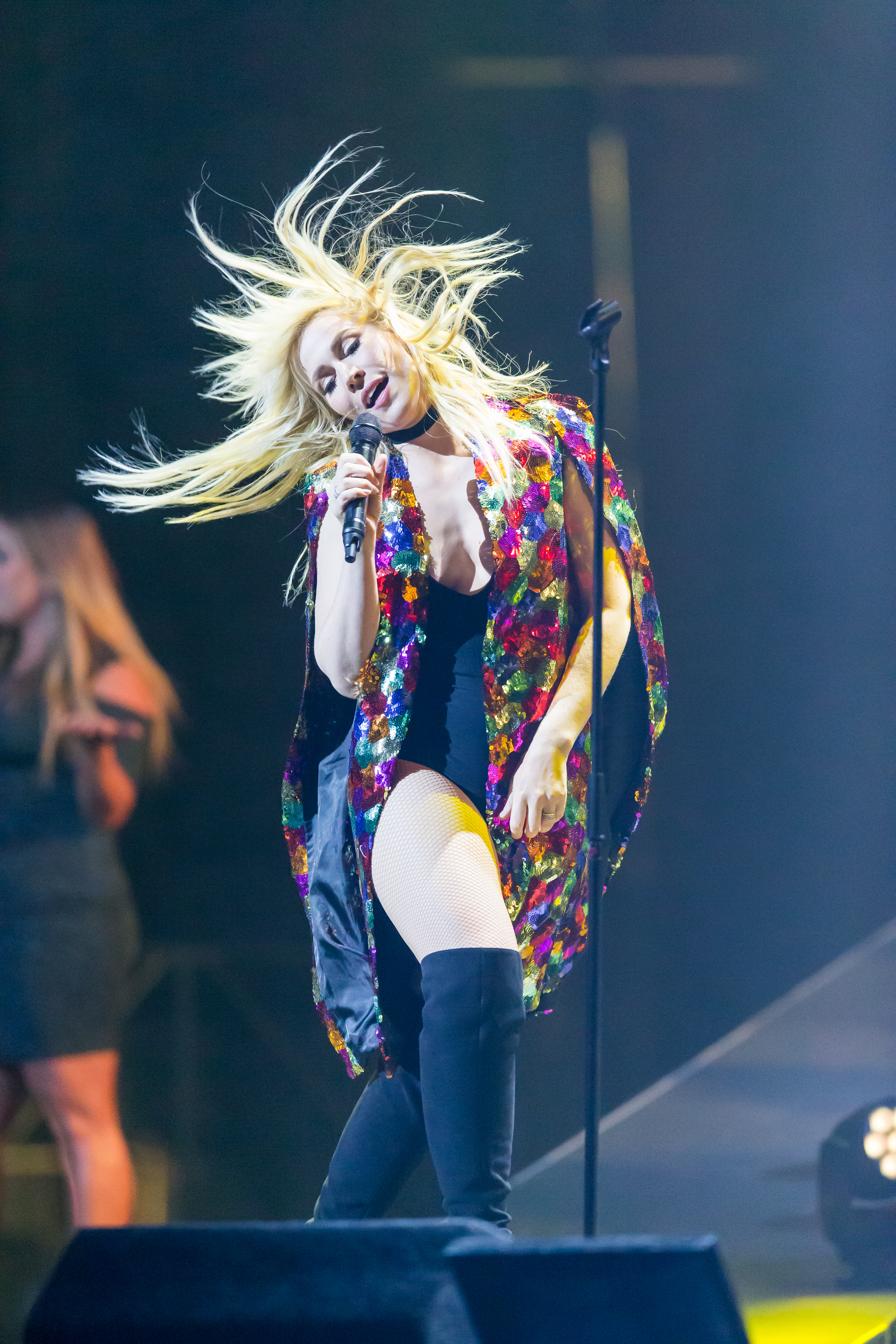
Bedingfield performing "Unwritten" in Mannheim, Germany, in 2016

"Unwritten" peaked at number five for two weeks on the Hot 100 and stayed in the chart for 38 weeks, thirteen of those inside the top ten, eventually appearing at number six on the 2006 Hot 100-year-end chart. Estimated sales in the United States for "Unwritten" are 2,731,000 as of June 2011. This was the third-highest ranking for a female artist for 2006 behind "Hips Don't Lie" by Shakira and Wyclef Jean, and "Promiscuous" by Nelly Furtado and Timbaland.

The song also proved very popular in other radio formats in the United States. The Johnny Vicious and Hani Club Mixes peaked at number one on the Dance Club Play and number two on the Dance Radio Airplay chart, while the original version went to number two on the Adult Top 40 and spent ten weeks at number one on the Adult Contemporary chart. "Unwritten" was not as successful in the United Kingdom as her previous chart-topping hit "These Words", but made an impressive showing on the charts, peaking at number six. It is one of her few singles to peak higher in the US than in the UK.

== Legacy ==
Nielsen Media Research ranked "Unwritten" the second most-played song on US radio stations in 2006. Bedingfield performed the song at the Concert for Diana. She also performed this, alongside "Pocketful of Sunshine", in the seventh-season finale of the Canadian series Degrassi: The Next Generation. It is the theme song to the popular MTV series The Hills. Bedingfield later re-recorded another, slower version of "Unwritten" with production team Carney for use in the final episode of The Hills. A 2019 remix version appears as the theme song in The Hills sequel series, The Hills: New Beginnings.

BBC would use the song as the closing montage following England's defeat to Portugal in the UEFA Euro 2004 quarterfinals. The song was used for the Pantene television and radio advertisements. The song also appeared in the 2005 Disney Film Ice Princess in the film’s credits and is featured on the film’s original soundtrack. "Unwritten" has become a common song used to celebrate graduation due to its uplifting message about the future. The song saw a resurgence in popularity following its inclusion in the film Anyone but You in late 2023; it was subsequently used to soundtrack a number of TikTok videos.

== Track listings ==
UK CD1

1. "Unwritten"
2. "Wild Horses" (live in Sydney)

UK CD2

1. "Unwritten"
2. "The Scientist" (Radio 1 Live Lounge recording)
3. "If You're Gonna Jump" (Paul Oakenfold 7-inch remix)
4. "Unwritten" (video)

Australian CD single

1. "Unwritten" (radio edit)
2. "The Scientist" (Radio 1 Live Lounge recording)
3. "If You're Gonna Jump" (Paul Oakenfold 7-inch remix)
4. "Unwritten" (album version)
5. "Unwritten" (video)

US CD single

1. "Unwritten" (album version) – 4:19
2. "Unwritten" (Johnny Vicious club mix) – 9:59
3. "Wild Horses" (live at the Nokia Theatre, New York) – 5:08
4. "Unwritten" (ringtone)

== Personnel ==
- Natasha Bedingfield – lead and background vocals, vocal arrangements
- Wayne Rodrigues – producer, engineer, drum programming, keyboards, turntables, Pro Tools editing, vocal arrangements
- Danielle Brisebois – producer, background vocals, vocal arrangements
- Nick Lashley – guitars
- Kenneth Crouch – B3 organ
- Nikola Bedingfield – background vocals
- Jessi Collins – background vocals
- Ryan Collins – background vocals
- Ryan Freeland – engineer
- Mark "Spike" Stent – mixing
- David Treahearn – mixing assistant
- Rob Haggett – mixing assistant

== Charts ==
=== Weekly charts ===
2004–2006 weekly chart performance for "Unwritten"
Chart (2004–2006)	Peak position
Australia (ARIA)	26
Austria (Ö3 Austria Top 40)	18
Belgium (Ultratop 50 Flanders)	22
Belgium (Ultratip Bubbling Under Wallonia)	9
Canadian Digital Songs (Billboard)	4
Canada CHR/Pop Top 30 (Radio & Records)	2
Canada Hot AC Top 30 (Radio & Records)	3
CIS Airplay (TopHit)	14
Czech Republic (Rádio – Top 100)	1
Germany (GfK)	22
Hungary (Rádiós Top 40)	17
Ireland (IRMA)	9
Netherlands (Dutch Top 40)	5
Netherlands (Single Top 100)	8
New Zealand (Recorded Music NZ)	15
Poland (Polish Airplay Chart)	1
Romania (Romanian Top 100)	30
Russia Airplay (TopHit)	11
Scottish Singles Sales (Official Charts)	6
Sweden (Sverigetopplistan)	32
Switzerland (Schweizer Hitparade)	26
UK Singles (Official Charts)	6
Ukraine Airplay (TopHit) Hani Num radio	128
US Billboard Hot 100	5
US Adult Contemporary (Billboard)	1
US Adult Pop Airplay (Billboard)	2
US Dance Club Songs (Billboard)	1
US Dance Airplay (Billboard)	2
US Pop Airplay (Billboard)	2

2024 weekly chart performance for "Unwritten"
Chart (2024)	Peak position
Australia (ARIA)	15
Austria (Ö3 Austria Top 40)	1
Belgium (Ultratop 50 Flanders)	35
Belgium (Ultratop 50 Wallonia)	50
Canada Hot 100 (Billboard)	32
Czech Republic Singles Digital (ČNS IFPI)	2
Denmark (Tracklisten)	28
Estonia Airplay (TopHit)	40
France (SNEP)	96
Germany (GfK)	5
Global 200 (Billboard)	20
Greece International (IFPI)	9
Hungary (Single Top 40)	11
Iceland (Tónlistinn)	7
Ireland (IRMA)	6
Israel (Mako Hitlist)	23
Italy (FIMI)	29
Latvia Streaming (LaIPA)	8
Lithuania (AGATA)	15
Luxembourg (Billboard)	9
Netherlands (Single Top 100)	20
New Zealand (Recorded Music NZ)	19
Norway (VG-lista)	15
Poland (Polish Streaming Top 100)	7
Portugal (AFP)	8
Slovakia Singles Digital (ČNS IFPI)	1
Spain (Promusicae)	47
Sweden (Sverigetopplistan)	21
Switzerland (Schweizer Hitparade)	4
UK Singles (Official Charts)	12

=== Monthly charts ===
2005 monthly chart performance for "Unwritten"
Chart (2005)	Peak position
CIS Airplay (TopHit)	15
Russia Airplay (TopHit)	9

2024 monthly chart performance for "Unwritten"
Chart (2024)	Peak position
Estonia Airplay (TopHit)	94
Lithuania Airplay (TopHit)	78

=== Year-end charts ===
2004 year-end chart performance for "Unwritten"
Chart (2004)	Position
UK Singles (OCC)	111

2005 year-end chart performance for "Unwritten"
Chart (2005)	Position
Netherlands (Dutch Top 40)	29
Netherlands (Single Top 100)	87

2006 year-end chart performance for "Unwritten"
Chart (2006)	Position
US Billboard Hot 100	6
US Adult Contemporary (Billboard)	5
US Adult Top 40 (Billboard)	4
US Dance Club Play (Billboard)	38
US Hot Dance Airplay (Billboard)	10

2024 year-end chart performance for "Unwritten"
Chart (2024)	Position
Australia (ARIA)	40
Austria (Ö3 Austria Top 40)	5
Canada (Canadian Hot 100)	91
Denmark (Tracklisten)	76
Estonia Airplay (TopHit)	145
Germany (GfK)	14
Global 200 (Billboard)	80
Hungary (Single Top 40)	84
Iceland (Tónlistinn)	30
Netherlands (Single Top 100)	49
New Zealand (Recorded Music NZ)	39
Poland (Polish Streaming Top 100)	74
Portugal (AFP)	42
Sweden (Sverigetopplistan)	64
Switzerland (Schweizer Hitparade)	24
UK Singles (OCC)	25

2025 year-end chart performance for "Unwritten"
Chart (2025)	Position
Austria (Ö3 Austria Top 40)	24
Estonia Airplay (TopHit)	162
Germany (GfK)	46
UK Singles (OCC)	84

== Certifications ==
Certifications for "Unwritten"
Region	Certification	Certified units/sales
Australia (ARIA)	7× Platinum	490,000^{‡}
Canada (Music Canada)	Platinum	40,000^{*}
Denmark (IFPI Danmark)	2× Platinum	180,000^{‡}
Germany (BVMI)	3× Gold	900,000^{‡}
Hungary (MAHASZ)	2× Platinum	20,000^{‡}
Italy (FIMI)	Platinum	100,000^{‡}
New Zealand (RMNZ)	6× Platinum	180,000^{‡}
Portugal (AFP)	3× Platinum	30,000^{‡}
Spain (Promusicae)	2× Platinum	120,000^{‡}
United Kingdom (BPI)	4× Platinum	2,400,000^{‡}
United States (RIAA)	2× Platinum	2,000,000^{*}
United States (RIAA) Mastertone	Gold	500,000^{*}
Streaming
Greece (IFPI Greece)	Gold	1,000,000^{†}
^{*} Sales figures based on certification alone.^{‡} Sales+streaming figures based on certification alone.^{†} Streaming-only figures based on certification alone.

== Release history ==
Release dates and formats for "Unwritten"
Region	Date	Format(s)	Version	Label	Ref.
United Kingdom	29 November 2004	CD	Original	Phonogenic	
United Kingdom	17 January 2005	Digital download	Original	Phonogenic	
Germany	17 January 2005	Digital download	Original	Sony	
Australia	24 January 2005	CD	Original	Sony	
Germany	7 February 2005	CD	Original	Sony	
United States	17 October 2005	Contemporary hit radio; rhythmic contemporary radio	Original	Epic	
Various	21 June 2019	Digital download	The 2019 Remix	We Are Hear	
Italy	2 February 2024	Radio airplay	Original	Sony Italy	

== See also ==
- List of number-one dance singles of 2006 (U.S.)
- List of Billboard Adult Contemporary number ones of 2006 and 2007 (U.S.)
