= The Script (album) =

Studio album by The Script
- Released: 8 August 2008
- Genres: Alternative rock; pop rock
- Length: 38:23
- Labels: Phonogenic; Epic
- Producers: Steve Kipner; Danny O'Donoghue; Andrew Frampton; Mark Sheehan

The Script chronology
iTunes Festival: London 2008 (2008)	The Script (2008)	iTunes Sessions (2010)

Singles from The Script
- 1. "We Cry" Released: 25 April 2008; 2. "The Man Who Can't Be Moved" Released: 28 July 2008; 3. "Breakeven" Released: 24 November 2008; 4. "Talk You Down" Released: 16 March 2009; 5. "Before the Worst" Released: 15 June 2009

The Script is the debut album by Irish pop rock trio the Script, which was released in Ireland on 8 August 2008 and was released in the UK on 11 August 2008 by Phonogenic Records. Following success in Ireland, the album was released elsewhere in Europe in September 2008. The album topped the UK charts and peaked at number 64 on the US Billboard 200 on 4 March 2010. The album was nominated for a Choice Music Prize-Irish Album of the Year 2008.

== Reception ==
Professional ratings
Review scores
Source	Rating
AllMusic	3.5/5 stars
BBC	(Positive)
Digital Spy	3/5 stars
Entertainment.ie	3/5 stars
The Guardian	2/5 stars
MTV Asia	(7/10)
NME	(2/10)
The Independent	2/5 stars
The Times	2/5 stars

The album was met with mixed reviews from music critics. Timothy Powell of the BBC stated that the album "reveals a band that is fresh, vital and ferociously good." He went on to say that the Script are now positioned as "next big thing" and that the album entails "hip-hop, pop melodiousness, state-of-the-art production and anthemic rock." His overall summary was that the album is "Intelligent, beautifully crafted and compelling." Nick Levine of Digital Spy gave the album 3/5 stars while saying it was often "devastatingly effective" and that "A lot of people are going to hate the Script, a lot of people are going to love the Script."

The German WOM magazin monthly went as far as writing: "Eigenständing und originell ist anders. The Script bringen die Misere der Musikindustrie auf den Punkt. (Independent and original [music] is different. The Script points out the music industry's demise.)" The album has mixed reviews in MTV Asia, which has praised "O'Donoghue's vocals are a pleasurably unique aural experience" though it also comments that, as a whole, "the album plays across a flat plane, with no big leaps, but no huge letdowns either." AllMusic's Alexey Eremenko said that the album was "not reckless or fuzzy enough [to be] power pop"; instead the closest discernible influence was the rock style of U2.

== Chart performance ==
Following the success of "The Man Who Can't Be Moved", The Script entered the UK Albums Charts at number one with sales of 54,520 copies where it stayed for two weeks. The album spent eight weeks in the top ten and was the twelfth best selling album in the UK of 2008. The album also entered the Irish Album Chart at number one, holding the top spot for five weeks. It had, of January 2009, spent twenty two weeks in the top ten. The Irish office of Sony BMG music presented the group with their first multi-Platinum award disc for over 600,000 sales of The Script. On Sunday, 18 January 2009, the album went back up to number 1 in the UK Album Charts, a whole 5 months since it was first released, mainly because of the £3.95 deal on iTunes. Though released in 2008, the album was the 198th best-selling album in 2010 in the USA. It has so far spent over 174 weeks in the UK albums chart.

=== Singles ===
Five singles were released from The Script. The first single that released from the album was "We Cry". The song peaked at #13 on the UK Singles Chart. It was followed by the second single, "The Man Who Can't Be Moved", which peaked at number 2 on the UK Singles Chart, becoming the Script's highest-charting single until "Hall of Fame" topped the charts in 2012. In December 2008, the Script released "Breakeven" as their third single from the album. It peaked at number 21 on the UK chart. The Script then released "Talk You Down" in 2009, as the fourth single from the album. However, the single failed to reach the success of the album's first three singles, missing the UK Top 40 and only peaking at number 47. "Breakeven" was released in fall 2009 in the United States and the Script performed it live on The Ellen DeGeneres Show on 14 October 2009. "Breakeven" then went on to peak at 12 in the US where it was also certified Platinum for shipment of 1,000,000 copies. "Breakeven" was also released in Australia where it peaked at number 3 and was certified Platinum.

In May 2009, the Script confirmed that a fifth single would be released from the album. "Before the Worst" was released on 15 June 2009 in the UK. It peaked at number 96 on the UK Singles Chart, becoming the lowest charting single from The Script in the UK. In Australia, it peaked at number 10 and was certified Platinum.

== Track listing ==
All songs produced by Mark Sheehan and Danny O'Donoghue, except where noted.

No.	Title	Writer(s)	Producer(s)	Length
1.	"We Cry"	Mark Sheehan, Danny O'Donoghue, Glen Power, Steve Kipner, Andrew Frampton	O'Donoghue, Sheehan, Kipner^{[a]}, Frampton^{[a]}	3:45
2.	"Before the Worst"	Sheehan, O'Donoghue, Power	O'Donoghue, Sheehan, Kipner^{[a]}, Frampton^{[a]}	3:23
3.	"Talk You Down"	Sheehan, O'Donoghue		3:51
4.	"The Man Who Can't Be Moved"	Sheehan, O'Donoghue, Kipner, Frampton	Sheehan, O'Donoghue, Kipner, Frampton	4:02
5.	"Breakeven"	Sheehan, O'Donoghue, Kipner, Frampton	Sheehan, O'Donoghue, Kipner, Frampton	4:21
6.	"Rusty Halo"	Sheehan, O'Donoghue		3:35
7.	"The End Where I Begin"	Sheehan, O'Donoghue		3:34
8.	"Fall for Anything"	Sheehan, O'Donoghue		4:33
9.	"If You See Kay"	Sheehan, O'Donoghue, Tony McGuinness		3:14
10.	"I'm Yours"	O'Donoghue		4:15
Total length:				38:23

Bonus track
No.	Title	Writer(s)	Producer(s)	Length
11.	"Anybody There"	Sheehan, O'Donoghue, Power, Kipner, Frampton	Sheehan, O'Donoghue	3:00
Total length:				41:23

Japanese bonus tracks
No.	Title	Writer(s)	Producer(s)	Length
11.	"Anybody There"	Sheehan, O'Donoghue		3:00
12.	"Live Like We're Dying"	Sheehan, O'Donoghue, Kipner, Frampton	Sheehan, O'Donoghue, Kipner, Frampton	3:34
13.	"We Cry" (Live Mix)	Sheehan, O'Donoghue, Power, Kipner, Frampton	Sheehan, O'Donoghue, Kipner, Frampton	4:16
Total length:				49:13

Deluxe edition bonus DVD
No.	Title	Length
1.	"We Cry" (Music Video)	4:16
2.	"The Man Who Can't Be Moved" (Music Video)	4:02
3.	"Breakeven" (Music Video)	4:22
4.	"Talk You Down" (Music Video)	3:50
5.	"The Script: Live in Dublin" (Documentary)	23:36
Total length:		40:06

B-Sides
No.	Title	Writer(s)	Producer(s)	Length
1.	"Rusty Halo" (Live at the Shephard's Bush Empire)	Sheehan, O'Donoghue	O'Donoghue	3:53
2.	"None the Wiser" (Demo)	Sheehan, O'Donoghue		3:11
3.	"Lose Yourself" (BBC Radio 1 Live Lounge)	Marshall Mathers, Luis Resto		4:46
4.	"Before the Worst" (Armand Van Helden Remix)	Sheehan, O'Donoghue, Power	Sheehan, O'Donoghue, Kipner^{[a]}, Frampton^{[a]}, Van Helden^{[a]}^{[b]}	5:46
5.	"Bullet from a Gun"	O'Donoughue, Sheehan		4:11
6.	"Before the Worst" (Demo)	Sheehan, O'Donoghue, Power	Sheehan, O'Donoghue, Kipner^{[a]}, Frampton^{[a]}	3:18
7.	"Breakeven" (Live at the Shephard's Bush Empire)	Sheehan, O'Donoghue, Kipner, Frampton	Sheehan, O'Donoghue, Kipner, Frampton	5:11
8.	"Before the Worst" (Live at the Islington Academy)	Sheehan, O'Donoghue, Power	Sheehan, O'Donoghue, Kipner, Frampton	4:08
Total length:				34:24

Notes

- ^{^[a]} signifies an additional producer
- ^{^[b]} signifies a remixer

== Personnel ==
All credits for The Script are adapted from the album's liner notes.

The Script

- Mark Sheehan – instruments, vocals; production
- Danny O'Donoghue – lead vocals, instruments; production; string arrangement (4, 11)
- Glen Power – instruments, vocals

Additional musicians

- Paul Inder – additional bass & guitars
- Elad Fish – drums (9)
- Steve Hussy – string composer (4, 11)

Technical personnel

- Steve Kipner – production (4, 5); additional production (1, 2)
- Andrew Frampton – production (4, 5); additional production (1, 2)
- Mark "Spike" Stent – mixing (1, 3–5)
- Dan Frampton – mixing (2, 6–11, "Rusty Halo (live)", "Before the Worst (demo)"); engineering (1, 2, 6–11)
- iwantdesign – art design
- Max Dodson – photography
- Roxy Maromyan – photography

== Charts ==
=== Weekly charts ===
Weekly chart performance for The Script
Chart (2008–09)	Peak position
Australian Albums (ARIA)	9
Austrian Albums (Ö3 Austria)	39
Belgian Albums (Ultratop Flanders)	66
Belgian Albums (Ultratop Wallonia)	52
Danish Albums (Hitlisten)	15
Dutch Albums (Album Top 100)	25
Finnish Albums (Suomen virallinen lista)	33
French Albums (SNEP)	38
German Albums (Offizielle Top 100)	32
Irish Albums (IRMA)	1
Italian Albums (FIMI)	38
Japanese Albums (Oricon)	34
New Zealand Albums (RMNZ)	15
Spanish Albums (Promusicae)	71
Swedish Albums (Sverigetopplistan)	6
Swiss Albums (Schweizer Hitparade)	16
UK Albums (Official Charts)	1
US Billboard 200	64
US Top Rock Albums (Billboard)	16

=== Year-end charts ===
2008 year-end chart performance for The Script
Chart (2008)	Position
European Top 100 Albums (Billboard)	56
Irish Albums (IRMA)	3
UK Albums (OCC)	12

2009 year-end chart performance for The Script
Chart (2009)	Position
Australian Albums (ARIA)[	34
European Top 100 Albums (Billboard)	57
Irish Albums (IRMA)	10
UK Albums (OCC)	37

2010 year-end chart performance for The Script
Chart (2010)	Position
UK Albums (OCC)	111
US Billboard 200	198

2011 year-end chart performance for The Script
Chart (2011)	Position
UK Albums (OCC)	148

2012 year-end chart performance for The Script
Chart (2012)	Position
UK Albums (OCC)	91

== Certifications ==
Region	Certification	Certified units/sales
Australia (ARIA)	Platinum	70,000^{^}
Ireland (IRMA)	5× Platinum	75,000^{^}
Italy (FIMI)	Gold	25,000^{‡}
New Zealand (RMNZ)	Gold	7,500^{‡}
United Kingdom (BPI)	4× Platinum	1,367,184
Summaries
Europe (IFPI)	Platinum	1,000,000^{*}
^{*} Sales figures based on certification alone.^{^} Shipments figures based on certification alone.^{‡} Sales+streaming figures based on certification alone.

== Release history ==
Country	Date
Ireland	8 August 2008
United Kingdom	11 August 2008
Europe	19 September 2008
Japan	22 October 2008
United States	17 March 2009
Brazil	24 August 2009
