= Unwritten (album) =

- Standard edition cover (Note: The cover was used outside North America. On pressings distributed outside the United Kingdom, a light yellow frame borders the image.)

Studio album by Natasha Bedingfield
- Released: 6 September 2004
- Recorded: 2003–2004
- Genres: Pop; R&B
- Length: 47:01
- Label: Phonogenic
- Producers: Danielle Brisebois; Guy Chambers; Richard Flack; Andrew Frampton; Peter Wade Keusch; Steve Kipner; Nick Lashley; Patrick Leonard; Wayne Rodrigues; Greg Wells; Wayne Wilkins

Natasha Bedingfield chronology
Unwritten (2004)	N.B. (2007)

Alternative cover
- North American editions cover (Note: The 2006 reissue cover features the image used for the single cover for "Single".)

Singles from Unwritten
- 1. "Single" Released: 3 May 2004; 2. "These Words" Released: 16 August 2004; 3. "Unwritten" Released: 29 November 2004; 4. "I Bruise Easily" Released: 4 April 2005

Unwritten is the debut studio album by the English singer and songwriter Natasha Bedingfield. It was first released in the United Kingdom and subsequently elsewhere in Europe on 6 September 2004 through Phonogenic Records, before being released in North America nearly a year later, on 2 August 2005, through Epic Records. A glossy, modern pop album with contemporary R&B touches, Unwritten was created in collaboration with several producers, including Danielle Brisebois, Guy Chambers, Peter Wade Keusch, and Steve Kipner, with Bedingfield co-writing every song on the album.

The album received generally favorable reviews, with critics praising its polished production, catchy melodies, strong vocals, and broad pop appeal. Unwritten debuted at number one on the UK Albums Chart, and was certified 3× Platinum, selling one million copies in the United Kingdom by 2013. Internationally, it reached the top ten in several European countries and charted within the top 30 in North America and Japan, with total worldwide sales of 2.3 million copies, and earned gold certifications in Germany and the United States, reflecting its strong global success.

The album's singles, including "Single", "These Words", "Unwritten" and "I Bruise Easily," achieved strong chart success, with "These Words" becoming Bedingfield's first UK number one and "Unwritten" gaining significant US radio play, while "I Bruise Easily" was a moderate hit. Bedingfield received multiple Brit Award and Grammy Award nominations between 2005 and 2007, though she did not win in any of the nominated categories. In 2006, the album was re-released in North America with new artwork and an updated tracklist featuring "The One That Got Away."

== Background ==
As a teenager, Bedingfield formed a dance/electronic group called The DNA Algorithm with her brother Daniel and sister Nikola. She later enrolled at the University of Greenwich, where she studied psychology for one year, but ultimately left to focus full-time on her music career. During this period, she recorded demo tracks in friends' garages and home studios, which she submitted to record labels. In the early 2000s, Bedingfield composed, wrote, and recorded songs for Hillsong Church UK. Her work appeared on live worship albums including Blessed and Shout God's Fame, as well as the children’s album Jesus Is My Superhero, released by Hillsong Music Australia.

In 2003, Bedingfield was introduced to Phonogenic Records founder and A&R executive Paul Lisberg by her manager Gary Wilson. Although Lisberg was initially uncertain about signing her, he became convinced of her potential after hearing her sing and improvise vocally in person. Subsequent trial studio sessions with songwriters Steve Kipner and Andrew Frampton produced material that aligned with Phonogenic's vision. As a result, Bedingfield signed a recording contract with BMG through Phonogenic Records in July 2003, where she became a priority act for the company.

== Promotion ==
Released in May 2004, the album's lead single, "Single", peaked at number three on the UK Singles Chart, while also reaching the top ten Ireland and the Netherlands. Its lyrics and accompanying music video portray Bedingfield's life as a single woman. The second single from Unwritten, "These Words," details Bedingfield's lack of inspiration and her reaction to pressure from her record label to produce a successful song. Released in August 2004, the song became Bedingfield's international breakthrough, reaching number one in Ireland, Poland, and the United Kingdom, entering the top ten in most other major markets, and peaking within the top twenty in the United States.

The album's title track was released as the third single in November 2004. It achieved strong commercial success in multiple markets, peaking at number six on the UK Singles Chart and becoming Bedingfield's highest-charting single in the United States, where it reached number five and was the second most-played song on US radio in 2006. The song experienced a resurgence in popularity after being featured in the comedy film Anyone but You in late 2023 and was subsequently used in numerous TikTok videos. Unwritten's fourth and final single, "I Bruise Easily", achieved moderate success, reaching number twelve in the United Kingdom and scoring additional top 20 entries in Ireland and the Netherlands.

== Critical reception ==
Professional ratings
Review scores
Source	Rating
AllMusic	3.5/5 stars
Blender	3/5 stars
Robert Christgau	(1-star Honorable Mention)
Entertainment Weekly	B+
The Guardian	4/5 stars
The Observer	4/5 stars
PopMatters	7/10
Rolling Stone	3/5 stars
RTÉ	4/5 stars
Yahoo! Music UK	8/10

The album received generally favorable reviews from critics. Adrien Begrand of PopMatters awarded the album a score of 7 out of 10, describing it as Bedingfield's "brand of clever, R&B-infused pop," while noting that it was "not without its pitfalls." David Hooper of BBC Music also offered a positive assessment, writing that "there's no denying this is a finely-crafted number with bold, voluptuous harmonies," and adding that it was "guaranteed to thrill, at least for the first 30 plays." Hooper further described Unwritten as a "textbook quality pop album," praising Bedingfield's strong vocals, immaculate production, and memorable singles, concluding that its songs were difficult to forget regardless of personal taste. Writing for The Guardian, Caroline Sullivan described the album as "fantastic fun," noting that while Unwritten lacked spontaneity due to its highly polished, commercially calibrated sound, it nevertheless ranked among the best pop debuts of 2004. She highlighted the strength of the songwriting, co-written with collaborators such as Guy Chambers, and cited early tracks "Single" and "These Words" as immediate indicators of the album’s quality.

Peter Robinson of The Observer characterized Unwritten as a "collection of excellent songs with a dizzying array of influences," observing that the album's strongest moments were found less in its lyrics than in its grooves, crisp production, and Bedingfield's distinctive vocals. David Welsh of UK-based music website musicOMH praised the album as a "startlingly accomplished debut," comparing Bedingfield's success favorably to that of her brother, Daniel Bedingfield. He described Unwritten as both "musically note-worthy and lyrically substantial," concluding that there was "no shame in adding this to your collection." Leah Greenblatt of Entertainment Weekly echoed the album’s broad appeal, writing: "Yes, it’s pop, straight up: something you wouldn’t be loath to buy your kid sister — and wouldn't be embarrassed to borrow from her either." RTÉ described Unwritten as a "near-faultless collection of songs. From the poetic hip-hop chart-topper "These Words" right down to the soulful ballad "I Bruise Easily," the content of this album is both impressive and broadranging." Dan Gennoe, writing Yahoo! Music UK, called it a "ferociously ambitious debut, noting that "while Unwritten isn't perfect, it's a phenomenal start," echoing praise for Natasha Bedingfield’s bold, confident, and highly accomplished introduction that established her independence from her brother Daniel.

== Commercial performance ==
Unwritten has sold 2.3 million copies worldwide. It debuted at number one on the UK Albums Chart in the chart week dated 18 September 2004. The album spent 19 weeks within the chart's top 20 and a total of 29 weeks on the chart overall. It was certified gold by the British Phonographic Industry (BPI) on 10 September 2004 and achieved platinum status one week later. The album has since been certified 3× Platinum in the United Kingdom. The Official Charts Company ranked it 19th on its 2004 year-end chart. By 2013, Unwritten had sold one million copies domestically.

Elsewhere, the album reached number four on the Irish Albums Chart and entered the top ten of Billboard's European Top 100 Albums chart at number seven. it also peaked at number 14 in Sweden, number 16 in the Netherlands, number 19 in Hungary, number 20 in Germany, and number 23 in Switzerland. Outside Europe, Unwritten reached number 19 on the Canadian Albums Chart and peaked at number 26 on Japan's Oricon Albums Chart, while also opening and peaking at number 26 on the US Billboard 200 with first week sales of 34,000 units. Reflecting its sustained sales performance, the album was certified gold by the Bundesverband Musikindustrie (BVMI) in Germany for shipments of 100,000 units, and by the Recording Industry Association of America (RIAA) in the United States for sales exceeding 500,000 units.

== Track listing ==
Unwritten – Standard edition
No.	Title	Writer(s)	Producer(s)	Length
1.	"These Words"	Natasha Bedingfield; Steve Kipner; Andrew Frampton; Wayne Wilkins	Kipner; Frampton; Wilkins	3:36
2.	"Single"	Bedingfield; Kipner; Frampton; Wilkins	Kipner; Frampton; Wilkins	3:57
3.	"I'm a Bomb"	Bedingfield; Kipner; Frampton; Wilkins	Kipner; Frampton; Wilkins	3:42
4.	"Unwritten"	Bedingfield; Danielle Brisebois; Wayne Rodrigues	Rodrigues; Brisebois	4:19
5.	"I Bruise Easily"	Bedingfield; Frampton; Wilkins; Paul Herman	Frampton; Wilkins	4:14
6.	"If You're Gonna Jump"	Bedingfield; Kipner; Frampton; Wilkins	Kipner; Frampton; Wilkins	3:22
7.	"Silent Movie"	Bedingfield; Guy Chambers	Chambers; Richard Flack	3:47
8.	"We're All Mad In Our Way"	Bedingfield; Brisebois; Nick Lashley	Rodrigues; Brisebois; Lashley	4:48
9.	"Frogs & Princes"	Bedingfield; Kipner; Frampton; Wilkins	Kipner; Frampton	3:45
10.	"Drop Me in the Middle" (featuring Bizarre from D12)	Bedingfield; Brisebois; Rodrigues; Rufus Johnson	Rodrigues; Brisebois	4:16
11.	"Wild Horses"	Bedingfield; Kipner; Frampton; Wilkins	Kipner; Frampton	4:01
12.	"Sojourn" (hidden track)	Bedingfield; Jon O'Mahony; Nick Keynes; Michael Harwood		3:19

Unwritten – UK edition (bonus tracks)
No.	Title	Writer(s)	Producer(s)	Length
12.	"Size Matters"	Bedingfield; Kipner; Frampton; Wilkins	Kipner; Frampton; Wilkins	3:25
13.	"Peace of Me"	Bedingfield; Patrick Leonard; Kara DioGuardi	Leonard	3:45
14.	"Sojourn" (hidden track)	Bedingfield; O'Mahony; Keynes; Harwood		3:19
Total length:				54:16

Unwritten — Japanese edition (bonus tracks)
No.	Title	Writer(s)	Producer(s)	Length
12.	"Size Matters"	Bedingfield; Kipner; Frampton; Wilkins	Kipner; Frampton; Wilkins	3:25
13.	"Peace of Me"	Bedingfield; Leonard; DioGuardi	Leonard	3:45
14.	"The One That Got Away"	Bedingfield; Kipner; Frampton; Wilkins; Nathan Winkler; Michael Tafaro	Kipner; Frampton; Wilkins; Winkler; Tafaro	4:16
15.	"Sojourn" (hidden track)	Bedingfield; O'Mahony; Keynes; Harwood		3:19
Total length:				58:32

Unwritten – North American and Japanese reissue edition
No.	Title	Writer(s)	Producer(s)	Length
1.	"These Words"	Bedingfield; Kipner; Frampton; Wilkins	Kipner; Frampton; Wilkins	3:38
2.	"Single"	Bedingfield; Kipner; Frampton; Wilkins	Kipner; Frampton; Wilkins	3:54
3.	"Unwritten"	Bedingfield; Brisebois; Rodrigues	Rodrigues; Brisebois	4:15
4.	"Silent Movie"	Bedingfield; Chambers	Chambers; Flack	3:45
5.	"Stumble"	Shelly Peiken; Greg Wells	Wells	3:36
6.	"Peace of Me"	Bedingfield; DioGuardi; Leonard	Leonard	3:42
7.	"If You're Gonna..."	Bedingfield; Kipner; Frampton; Wilkins	Kipner; Frampton; Wilkins	3:12
8.	"Drop Me in the Middle" (featuring Estelle)	Bedingfield; Brisebois; Rodrigues; Estelle Swaray	Rodrigues; Brisebois	4:14
9.	"We're All Mad"	Bedingfield; Brisebois; Lashley	Rodrigues; Brisebois; Lashley	4:46
10.	"I Bruise Easily"	Bedingfield; Frampton; Wilkins; Herman	Frampton; Wilkins	4:12
11.	"The One That Got Away"	Bedingfield; Kipner; Frampton; Wilkins; Winkler; Tafaro	Kipner; Frampton; Wilkins; Winkler; Tafaro	4:16
12.	"Size Matters"	Bedingfield; Kipner; Frampton; Wilkins	Kipner; Frampton; Wilkins	3:23
13.	"Wild Horses"	Bedingfield; Frampton; Wilkins	Frampton; Wilkins	3:55
14.	"Sojourn" (hidden track)	Bedingfield; O'Mahony; Keynes; Harwood		3:19
Total length:				51:03

Unwritten – North American and European DualDisc edition (bonus DVD)
No.	Title	Director(s)	Length
1.	"Entire Album in Enhanced Stereo"
2.	"In the Studio Interview"
3.	"These Words" (music video; US version)	Chris Milk	3:43
4.	"Making of These Words"
5.	"Single" (music video)	Jake Nava	3:30
6.	"I Bruise Easily" (music video)	Matthew Rolston	3:46

Notes

- Some versions of the album swap original versions of "Single", "These Words" and "The One That Got Away" for various remixes.

== Personnel ==
- Natasha Bedingfield – primary artist, lead vocals, background vocals, songwriting, vocal arrangements
- Keith Andes – additional keyboards ("Drop Me in the Middle")
- Dave Catlin-Birch – bass ("Silent Movie")
- Guy Chambers – guitar, keyboards, producer
- Justin Clayton – bass ("Peace of Me")
- Larry Corbett – cello ("Peace of Me")
- Keith Crouch – Hammond B-3 organ ("Unwritten")
- Paul Gordon – keyboards ("We're All Mad")
- Nick Ingman – string arrangements, conductor
- Patrick Leonard – music programming, keyboards ("Peace of Me")
- David Low – cello ("Stumble")
- Tim Pierce – guitar ("Peace of Me")
- Robbie Campos – guitar, keyboards
- Michele Richards – violin ("Peace of Me")
- Josephina Vergara – violin ("Peace of Me")
- Greg Wells – bass, guitar, piano, drums
- Joey Waronker – drums ("Peace of Me")
- Danielle Brisebois – background vocals ("Unwritten"), producer, vocal arrangements
- Jessica Collins – background vocals ("Unwritten" and "Drop Me in the Middle")
- Nikola Bedingfield – background vocals ("Unwritten" and "Drop Me in the Middle")
- Ryan Collins – background vocals ("Unwritten")
- J. Curtis – guitar ("Size Matters")
- Nick Lashley – guitar, keyboards
- Wayne Wilkins – piano, keyboards
- Chris Brown – bass ("If You're Gonna...")
- Paul Herman – guitar ("I Bruise Easily")
- Wayne Rodrigues – keyboards, turntables
- Andrew Frampton – guitar, keyboards, programming, producer, vocal arrangements, string arrangements
- Simon Hill – drums ("If You're Gonna...")
- Andrew Duckles – viola ("Peace of Me")
- Tony Hodson – guitar ("Drop Me in the Middle")
- Paul Stanborough – additional guitars ("Silent Movie")
- Steve Kipner – producer, vocal arrangements
- Joe Chiccarelli – engineer
- John Hill – producer
- Nick Ingman – string arrangements, string conductor
- Patrick Leonard – programming, producer
- Steve MacMillan – engineer
- Herb Powers – mastering
- Greg Wells – programming, producer
- Gavyn Wright – string conductor
- Suzie Katayama – string contractor
- Nick Lashley – producer, engineer
- David Channing – digital editing
- Michael Perfitt – engineer, digital editing
- Ryan Freeland – engineer
- James Cruz – mastering
- Wayne Wilkins – programming, producer, engineer, vocal arrangements, string arrangements
- Ian Cuttler – art direction
- Richard Flack – producer, engineer, drum programming
- Robbie Campos – vocal arrangements, string arrangements
- Wayne Rodrigues – producer, engineer, digital editing, vocal arrangements, drum programming, Pro-Tools
- Michelle Holme – art direction
- Kieron Menzies – engineer
- Chris Steffen – engineer
- Peter Wade Keusch – producer
- Lee Groves – mixing programmer
- Michael Tafaro – producer, vocal arrangements
- Nathan Winkler – producer, vocal arrangements

== Charts ==
=== Weekly charts ===
Weekly chart performance for Unwritten
Chart (2004–2024)	Peak position
Australian Albums (ARIA)	89
Austrian Albums (Ö3 Austria)	31
Belgian Albums (Ultratop Flanders)	73
Canadian Albums (Nielsen SoundScan)	19
Dutch Albums (Album Top 100)	16
European Top 100 Albums (Billboard)	7
French Albums (SNEP)	111
German Albums (Offizielle Top 100)	20
Hungarian Albums (MAHASZ)	19
Irish Albums (IRMA)	4
Japanese Albums (Oricon)	26
Mexican Albums (Top 100 Mexico)	33
New Zealand Albums (RMNZ)	31
Scottish Albums (Official Charts)	1
Swedish Albums (Sverigetopplistan)	14
Swiss Albums (Schweizer Hitparade)	23
UK Albums (Official Charts)	1
US Billboard 200	26

=== Year-end charts ===
2004 year-end chart performance for Unwritten
Chart (2004)	Position
UK Albums (OCC)	19

2005 year-end chart performance for Unwritten
Chart (2005)	Position
Dutch Albums (Album Top 100)	57
UK Albums (OCC)	85

2024 year-end chart performance for Unwritten
Chart (2024)	Position
Hungarian Albums (MAHASZ)	96

== Certifications ==
Certifications for Unwritten
Region	Certification	Certified units/sales
Germany (BVMI)	Gold	100,000^{‡}
New Zealand (RMNZ)	2× Platinum	30,000^{‡}
United Kingdom (BPI)	3× Platinum	1,000,000
United States (RIAA)	Gold	815,000
Summaries
Europe (IFPI)	Platinum	1,000,000^{*}
Worldwide	—	2,300,000
^{*} Sales figures based on certification alone.^{‡} Sales+streaming figures based on certification alone.

== Release history ==
Unwritten release history
Region	Date	Edition(s)	Format(s)	Label(s)	Ref.
United Kingdom	6 September 2004	Standard	CD; digital download	Phonogenic; BMG	
Germany	11 October 2004	Standard	CD; digital download	Phonogenic; BMG	
Japan	20 October 2004	Standard	CD; digital download	BMG Japan	
United States	2 August 2005	Standard	CD; digital download	Phonogenic; Epic	
United States	6 June 2006	Reissue	CD; digital download	Phonogenic; Epic	
