= Wayne Wilkins =

British record producer and songwriter

- Born: Wayne Andrew Wilkins; Croydon, London, England
- Genres: Hip hop; R&B; rap; pop; dance
- Occupations: Record producer; audio engineer; songwriter
- Years active: 2000–present
- Website: waynewilkins.com

Wayne Wilkins is a British record producer, songwriter, record engineer and record mixer. He has produced and written for artists such as Rick Astley ("Cry for Help"), Natasha Bedingfield ("These Words", "Single" and "Love Like This"), Beyoncé ("Sweet Dreams"), Cheryl Cole ("Fight For This Love", and "Promise This"), and Jordin Sparks ("Battlefield").

== Early life ==
Wilkins was born in Croydon, London. He began taking piano lessons at the age of four. Wilkins earned a scholarship to a music conservatory as a child. Growing up, he played organ at cathedrals and other venues around London.

Wilkins went on to the Royal College of Music in London. Wilkins later graduated with a physics degree from Imperial College. While in college one of Wilkins early jobs was teaching piano. He also interned at Townhouse Studios and Olympic Studios where he received further training in engineering, mixing, and producing.

== Career ==
While Wilkins was interning at Olympic Studios he got the opportunity to work for engineer Spike Stent. Stent's resume includes working with such artists as Madonna, Beyoncé, Björk, Lily Allen, Depeche Mode, Massive Attack, Yeah Yeah Yeahs, Oasis, U2, Usher, and Lady Gaga. Working for Stent provided Wilkins the opportunity to program for the engineer and work on high-budget recordings. During his tenure with Stent, Wilkins worked with Timbaland, Oasis, Rodney Jerkins, Madonna, and U2. Wilkins worked on the No Doubt Rock Steady album which Wilkins said later afforded him higher-profile work opportunities. Wilkins has cited artists such as Michael Jackson, David Foster, Whitney Houston, Chicago, John Williams, and Oscar Peterson as having a major influence on his style and tastes.

In 2000, Wilkins started working independently. The first band Wilkins produced after going independent was The Corrs.

In May 2004, Natasha Bedingfield released "Single", a song co-written and co-produced by Wilkins. Natasha Bedingfield followed with "These Words", which was released in August 2004. Wilkins co-wrote and co-produced another hit for Natasha Bedingfield, "Love Like This", which also featured Sean Kingston.

Wilkins co-wrote and co-produced the 2008 single "Energy" with members of The Runaways, Sam Watters, Rico Love, and Louis Biancaniello. Wilkins also co-wrote "We Break the Dawn" alongside Solange Knowles and Andrew Frampton for Michelle Williams's third album, Unexpected. He was also involved in creating the remix for the same song. In June 2008, Shontelle's "T-Shirt" was released. It was co-written by Wilkins. In November 2008, Beyoncé released her album, I Am... Sasha Fierce, which included Wilkins's production and co-written single "Sweet Dreams".

In 2009, he worked with Irish pop band Westlife on the track "Sound of a Broken Heart" included in their Where We Are album. Cheryl Cole released the single "Fight For This Love" in October 2009, taken from her album 3 Words. In July 2014, Cheryl Cole released the single "Crazy Stupid Love" from her fourth studio album. Wilkins co-wrote and co-produced the song, which also features British rapper Tinie Tempah.

== Songwriting and gears ==
Wilkins has stated that he prefers to start with chord progressions as opposed to lyrics. He has said he attempts to be a "vessel" in which music flows out of him naturally. He prefers writing and producing together. He says that he tends to write simple lyrics and chords.

Early in his career, Wilkins worked under mixing engineer Mark "Spike" Stent of EMI. Wilkins usually records an artist by moving to their place with portable gear. Wilkins's gear generally consists of an Apple Logic, a MacBook Pro, and an Apogee Symphony Mobile System.

== Singles ==
Year	Single	Chart positions									Album
Year	Single	AUS	FR	GER	IRE	UK	US Hot 100	US R&B	US Pop	US Dance	Album
2001	"Would You Be Happier?" (The Corrs)	47	61	81	26	14	–	–	–	–	Best of The Corrs
2004	"Single" (Natasha Bedingfield)	78	–	–	7	3	57	–	38	–	Unwritten
2004	"These Words" (Natasha Bedingfield)	5	19	2	1	1	17	–	9	35	Unwritten
2005	"I Bruise Easily" (Natasha Bedingfield)	–	–	46	17	12	–	–	–	–	Unwritten
2007	"I Wanna Have Your Babies" (Natasha Bedingfield)	50	–	39	8	7	–	–	–	–	NB
2007	"Love Like This" (Natasha Bedingfield ft. Sean Kingston)	77	–	33	34	20	11	–	–	1	Pocketful of Sunshine
2008	"We Break the Dawn" (Michelle Williams)	–	–	–	–	47	–	–	–	4	Unexpected
2008	"Energy" (Keri Hilson)	55	–	–	–	43	78	21	72	–	In a Perfect World...
2008	"T-Shirt" (Shontelle)	–	–	–	26	6	36	–	–	1	Shontelligence
2009	"Battlefield" (Jordin Sparks)	4	–	40	9	11	10	–	6	–	Battlefield
2009	"Sweet Dreams" (Beyoncé)	2	–	8	4	5	10	48	2	1	I Am... Sasha Fierce
2009	"Touch My Hand" (David Archuleta)	–	–	–	–	–	–	–	–	–	David Archuleta
2009	"Battle Cry" (Shontelle)	–	–	–	–	61	–	–	–	–	Shontelligence
2009	"Fight for This Love" (Cheryl Cole)	54	7	4	1	1	–	–	–	–	3 Words
2009	"No More" (Cassie Davis)	90	–	–	–	–	–	–	–	–	Differently
2010	"Strip Me" (Natasha Bedingfield)	–	–	–	–	–	91	–	–	–	Strip Me
2010	"Promise This" (Cheryl Cole)	78	–	–	1	1	–	–	–	–	Messy Little Raindrops
2011	"The Flood" (Cheryl Cole)	–	–	–	26	18	–	–	–	–	Messy Little Raindrops
2014	"Crazy Stupid Love" (Cheryl Cole ft. Tinie Tempah)	43	172	–	1	1	–	–	–	–	Only Human
2019	"Racing Cars" (Ruti Olajugbagbe)	-	-	–	-	49	–	–	–	–	Racing Cars

== Awards and nominations ==
- 2005 BMI London Award for "These Words"
- 2006 BMI London Award for "Single"
- 2007 BMI London Award for "Love Like This"
- 2008 BMI Pop Award for "Love Like This"
- 2008 BMI London Award for "T-Shirt"
- 2009 BMI Pop Award for "Battlefield"
- 2010 BMI London Award for "Battlefield"
- 2010 BMI London Award for "Sweet Dreams"
