= Single (Natasha Bedingfield song) =

2004 single by Natasha Bedingfield

Single by Natasha Bedingfield

from the album Unwritten
- Released: 3 May 2004
- Length: 3:57
- Label: Phonogenic
- Songwriters: Natasha Bedingfield; Steve Kipner; Andrew Frampton; Wayne Wilkins
- Producers: Steve Kipner; Andrew Frampton; Wayne Wilkins

Natasha Bedingfield singles chronology
"Single" (2004)	"These Words" (2004)

Music video
- "Single" on YouTube

"Single" is a song by British singer-songwriter Natasha Bedingfield, released as her debut single. Written by Steve Kipner, Andrew Frampton, Wayne Wilkins, and Bedingfield and produced by the former three, the song is lyrically about being single and not needing a partner. Phonogenic Records released the song on 3 May 2004 as the lead single from Bedingfield's debut studio album, Unwritten (2004). In the United States, it was serviced to contemporary hit radio on 24 April 2006 as the album's third single.

It received a positive reception from music critics. The song became a hit in the United Kingdom, peaking at number three on the UK Singles Chart and selling 27,413 copies during its first week. The song additionally entered the top 20 in Ireland, Norway and Sweden. In the US, "Single" became a minor success, reaching number 57 on the Billboard Hot 100.

== Commercial performance ==
"Single" entered the UK Singles Chart on 9 May 2004 at number three, remaining on the chart for 10 weeks. The track also entered the top 10 in Ireland, where it reached number seven. In continental Europe, it reached number 16 in Norway and number 17 in Sweden. In North America, "Single" debuted at number 72 on the US Billboard Hot 100 on 24 June 2006 and reached a peak of number 57, remaining on the chart for six weeks. It did well on pop-oriented charts, reaching number 38 on the Pop 100 and number 26 on the Mainstream Top 40.

== Music video ==
The music video features four sequences. In one, Bedingfield stops at a photo booth to take her picture.

The music video for "Single" was directed by Jake Nava and premiered on 26 March 2004 in the United Kingdom. The video features four sequences. It begins with Bedingfield waking up and getting ready to go out. She is then shown walking down the street past various shops, stopping at a photo booth to take photographs with a guy she had met on the street. Dressed in jeans and a silver jacket, she is next shown performing a choreographed dance with three female dancers in a tunnel. The final sequence of the video features Bedingfield at a party sitting outside on a patio, singing to herself. As the video concludes, she is shown staring at the camera as her image gradually fades.

In North America, a slightly different music video was released. The North American version featured extended photo booth and party scenes. The guy who Bedingfield meets at the photo booth is featured more prominently in the video, with Bedingfield singing the song to him. The music video, as well as behind-the-scenes footage, was released commercially on the song's CD single.

== Track listings and formats ==
Australian maxi CD single

1. "Single" – 3:57
2. "Single" (Delinquents "Right Now" refix) – 5:03
3. "Single" (Martijn ten Velden & Mark Knight Future Funk remix) – 7:44
4. "Single" (music video)
5. Picture gallery

UK CD single

1. "Single" – 3:57
2. "Single" (K-Gee remix) – 3:44

== Personnel ==
Personnel are taken from the Unwritten liner notes.

- Natasha Bedingfield – lead and backing vocals
- Wayne Wilkins – keyboards, engineering, programming
- Kate Jeynes – keyboards, engineering, programming
- Andrew Frampton – keyboards
- Mark "Spike" Stent – mixing
- David Treahearn – mixing assistant
- Rob Haggart – mixing assistant
- Herb Powers – mastering
- Sarah Powell – guitar

== Charts ==
=== Weekly charts ===
Chart (2004–2006)	Peak position
Australia (ARIA)	78
Canada CHR/Pop Top 40 (Radio & Records)	39
CIS Airplay (TopHit)	200
Europe (Eurochart Hot 100)	10
Ireland (IRMA)	7
Netherlands (Dutch Top 40 Tipparade)	8
Netherlands (Single Top 100)	80
Norway (VG-lista)	16
Russia Airplay (TopHit)	168
Scotland Singles (OCC)	3
Sweden (Sverigetopplistan)	17
UK Singles (OCC)	3
Ukraine Airplay (TopHit)	164
US Billboard Hot 100	57
US Pop Airplay (Billboard)	26

=== Year-end charts ===
Chart (2004)	Position
Sweden (Hitlistan)	96
UK Singles (OCC)	73

== Release history ==
Release dates and formats for "Single"
Region	Date	Format	Label	Ref.
United Kingdom	3 May 2004	CD	Phonogenic	
Denmark	21 June 2004	CD	Phonogenic	
United States	24 April 2006	Contemporary hit radio	Epic	
