= I Bruise Easily =

2005 single by Natasha Bedingfield

Single by Natasha Bedingfield

from the album Unwritten
- B-side: "You Look Good on Me"; "Ain't Nobody"
- Released: 4 April 2005
- Genre: Pop; R&B
- Length: 4:13 (album version); 3:43 (radio edit)
- Label: Phonogenic
- Songwriters: Natasha Bedingfield; Andrew Frampton; Wayne Wilkins; Paul Herman
- Producers: Andrew Frampton; Wayne Wilkins

Natasha Bedingfield singles chronology
| "Unwritten" (2004) | "I Bruise Easily" (2005) | "I Wanna Have Your Babies" (2007) |

"I Bruise Easily" is a song by British recording artist Natasha Bedingfield. The pop ballad was written by Andrew Frampton, Wayne Wilkins, and Paul Herman along with Bedingfield for her debut album, Unwritten (2004). Production on the track was handled by Frampton and Wilkins. In the song, Bedingfield describes how relationships affect people, even when they have come to an end.

The track was released as the album's fourth single in 2005 to positive reviews from music critics. While "I Bruise Easily" failed to match the success of its predecessor "Unwritten", it reached the top 20 in Ireland and the United Kingdom. In 2008, the song was used by electronic artist Chicane for the song "Bruised Water", a mashup between "I Bruise Easily" and Chicane's 1999 hit "Saltwater". The song was included on Chicane's The Best of Chicane: 1996–2008 and is credited as Chicane vs. Natasha Bedingfield.

== Background and writing ==
Bedingfield began recording her debut album in mid-2003, following the signing of a recording contract with BMG UK and Ireland earlier that year. While collaborating with Andrew Frampton, Wayne Wilkins and Paul Hermam in London, England, they composed "I Bruise Easily", which was inspired by a relationship Bedingfield had recently ended. While recording she had found it easier to compose songs that were melancholic rather than songs that were upbeat. According to Bedingfield, the song is actually a love song because "it's talking about vulnerability and the fact that the more you love someone, the more you have to open your heart" which means that "you could get hurt".

== Critical reception ==
The song was generally well received by contemporary pop music critics. Johnny Loftus of AllMusic called the song "epically romantic" and a "standout" from Unwritten. PopMatters stated that the song was a "worthy slow-burner highlighted by Natasha's soul-baring lyrics", and RTÉ Entertainment commented that the "soulful ballad" was "both impressive and broadranging." Andy Gill of The Independent gave it a very strong review, stating that the song contained some of the album's strongest lyrics that "deals sharply with the difficulties of finding Mr Right".

== Chart performance ==
"I Bruise Easily" was released as the fourth major single-release from Unwritten. Because it was released as the fourth single, success was very limited since many consumers had already purchased the album, which at the time had been certified triple platinum in the United Kingdom. It debuted on the UK Singles Chart on 11 April 2005 at number 12. It peaked at number 12 and remained on the chart for a total of seven weeks. "I Bruise Easily" failed to make an impact in Europe. It peaked outside the top 40 in Austria, Germany and Switzerland. The international CD single featured two B-sides. The track "Ain't Nobody", performed with Bedingfield's brother Daniel and recorded live at the BRIT Awards, is a cover version of the Chaka Khan and Rufus 1983 single. The song "You Look Good on Me" is an original Bedingfield composition.

== Music video ==
The music video features Bedingfield dressed as a geisha.

The music video was directed by Matthew Rolston and premiered on 28 February 2005. The video begins with Bedingfield entering an elevator dressed as a geisha. She then exits the elevator and wanders down a long hall looking for her hotel room. Sitting in front of a mirror, Bedingfield slowly removes her wig and makeup, revealing the pain she had been hiding. Scenes of Bedingfield singing on her bed and in a dark room are intercut throughout the video.

Bedingfield dressed as a geisha in the music video to represent how the feelings of pain and sadness are often not shown to others when a relationship ends. Out in public Bedingfield's character covers her feelings up with makeup, but alone she removes it, exposing how she truly feels inside. The complete version of "I Bruise Easily" featured in the music video has been released commercially through CD singles and digital downloads.

== Track listings ==
International maxi-CD single

1. "I Bruise Easily" (radio edit)
2. "Ain't Nobody" (with Daniel Bedingfield)
3. "You Look Good on Me"
4. "I Bruise Easily" (album version)
5. "I Bruise Easily" (music video)

European CD single

1. "I Bruise Easily" (radio edit)
2. "Ain't Nobody" (with Daniel Bedingfield)
3. "You Look Good on Me"
4. "I Bruise Easily" (music video)

== Charts ==
| Chart (2005) | Peak position |
|---|---|
| Austria (Ö3 Austria Top 40) | 46 |
| Belgium (Ultratip Bubbling Under Flanders) | 4 |
| Germany (GfK) | 46 |
| Ireland (IRMA) | 17 |
| Netherlands (Dutch Top 40) | 13 |
| Netherlands (Single Top 100) | 37 |
| Scottish Singles Sales (Official Charts) | 15 |
| Switzerland (Schweizer Hitparade) | 53 |
| UK Singles (Official Charts) | 12 |
| UK Hip Hop/R&B (Official Charts) | 24 |

== Release history ==
Release dates and formats for "I Bruise Easily"
| Region | Date | Format | Label | Ref. |
|---|---|---|---|---|
| United Kingdom | 4 April 2005 | CD single | Phonogenic | |
| United Kingdom | 9 May 2005 | Digital download | Phonogenic | |
| Germany | 9 May 2005 | Digital download | Sony | |
| Germany | 30 May 2005 | CD single | Sony | |
