= Hail to the King (Hillsong London album) =

Studio album by Hillsong London
- Released: 28 October 2008
- Recorded: 24 February 2008
- Genre: Indie rock, alternative rock, indie pop, pop rock, worship
- Length: 59:38
- Label: Hillsong Music Australia
- Producer: Peter Wilson

Hillsong London chronology
Jesus Is: Remix (2007)	Hail to the King (2008)

Hail to the King is the fourth album by Hillsong London. It features thirteen brand new songs led by Worship Pastor Peter Wilson, two of which were co-written with Grammy Award winner Israel Houghton.

Jared Johnson of AllMusic described the album as "straightforward Brit arena rock that envelopes worshipers in intense praise." He continued on to say that "The album effectively has two polar halves, the first being the rocking, strap-you-to-your-seat section, which gives way to a reverent, slow-building second half." Lins Honeyman of Cross Rhythms wrote that "Whilst this is very much a no frills affair (biographies, powerpoints and the like are not included), the disc does contain a wide variety of sheet music including notation for piano, guitar, drums and bass as well as overhead transparencies and rich text lyric versions of the songs featured on the album proper."

== Track listing ==
1. "Now" (Israel Houghton and Peter Wilson) – 4:20
2. "Hail to the King" (Jay Cook and Gio Galanti) – 3:35
3. "I’m Not Ashamed" (Paul Andrew) – 3:12
4. "Rise" (Jay Cook) – 3:57
5. "You Brought Me Home" (Christian Fontana and Gio Galanti) – 4:41
6. "You Are Here (The Same Power)" (Dave George and Grant Pankratz) – 5:47
7. "At Your Feet" (Dave George and Dave Kennedy) – 4:48
8. "I Receive" (Israel Houghton and Peter Wilson) – 5:38
9. "He Is Greater" (Jay Cook and David Kennedy) – 4:42
10. "Selah (Perfect Love)" (Jay Cook, Gio Galanti, and Ian Hutton)– 4:12
11. "Look to the Cross" (Dave George) – 5:05
12. "All To Show" (Dave George) – 4:25
13. "The Call" (Jay Cook) – 5:12

== Bonus CD (Live) Track Listing ==
1. "Hail to the King" – 3:42
2. "You Deserve" (from This Is Our God) – 5:07
3. "Rise" – 4:25
4. "Now" – 3:46
5. "He Is Greater" – 4:31
6. "You Are Here (The Same Power)" – 8:09
7. "Look to the Cross" – 5:49
8. "I Receive" – 6:48
