= Roll with Me (album) =

Studio album by Natasha Bedingfield
- Released: 30 August 2019
- Genres: Pop; reggae; R&B
- Length: 50:20
- Label: We Are Hear
- Producers: Linda Perry; Troy Nōka

Natasha Bedingfield chronology
Strip Me (2010)	Roll with Me (2019)

Singles from Roll with Me
- 1. "Roller Skate" Released: 19 July 2019; 2. "Kick It" Released: 2 August 2019

Roll with Me is the fourth studio album by English singer and songwriter Natasha Bedingfield, released on 30 August 2019 through We Are Hear. The lead single, "Roller Skate", was released on 19 July 2019; "Kick It" was released on 2 August as the second single and first song serviced to radio from the album, with other songs to become available before the album's release. It was produced by Linda Perry, and follows nine years after the release of her third studio album, Strip Me, which was released in 2010.

== Background ==
Bedingfield said her intention with the album was to "make music that moves people and makes them move their bodies and hair. It's bright and bold but in a way that is also raw and honest." Linda Perry stated that she wanted to work with Bedingfield because she feels she is "one of the best live performers I have ever seen and has one of the most versatile voices I have ever heard".

== Commercial performance ==
The album debuted at number 36 on the US Billboard Independent Albums chart.

== Track listing ==
All tracks are written by Natasha Bedingfield and Linda Perry, except "It Could Be Love" (Bedingfield, Perry, Lisa Vitale).

No.	Title	Length
1.	"Kick It"	4:28
2.	"Roller Skate"	3:31
3.	"Everybody Come Together" (featuring Angel Haze)	3:05
4.	"Hey Papa"	3:36
5.	"King of the World"	3:39
6.	"It Could Be Love"	3:41
7.	"Where We Going Now"	4:41
8.	"Can't Look Away"	2:43
9.	"Can't Let Go"	3:18
10.	"No Man I See"	3:27
11.	"Sweet Nothing"	3:13
12.	"I Feel You"	4:36
13.	"Wishful Thinking"	3:14
14.	"Real Love"	3:08
Total length:		50:20

Digital edition bonus tracks
No.	Title	Length
15.	"Roller Skate" (acoustic)	3:44
16.	"Kick It" (acoustic)	4:28
17.	"Everybody Come Together" (acoustic)	3:16
18.	"King of the World" (acoustic)	3:46
Total length:		65:34

== Personnel ==
- Natasha Bedingfield – lead vocals (all tracks), background vocals (all tracks)
- Linda Perry – keyboards (2–13), guitar (3, 8, 9, 11), acoustic guitar (4), drum programming (6, 9, 10, 13), background vocals (1), production (1–14), horn arrangement (2, 14), string arrangement (3, 7, 12)
- Luis Flores – assistant engineer (1–14), production (15–18)
- Adam Bravin – drum programming (1–5, 7, 9, 11, 12, 14), keyboards (1), production (1)
- David Saw – guitar (1, 2, 5–8, 10)
- Eli Pearl – guitar (1, 2, 4, 5, 7, 8, 11, 14)
- Angel Haze – lead vocals (3), background vocals (1, 4, 7, 12)
- Troy Nōka – keyboards (5, 6, 8, 11, 14), drum programming (6, 8), production (8)
- David Ralicke – trombone (2, 14)
- David Mayer – saxophone (2, 14)
- Danny Levin – trumpet (2, 14)
- Chris Bautista – trumpet (2, 14)
- Briana Lee – background vocals (2, 8–10, 12, 14)

== Charts ==
Chart performance for Roll with Me
Chart (2019)	Peak position
US Independent Albums (Billboard)	36
