= These Words =

2004 single by Natasha Bedingfield

Single by Natasha Bedingfield

from the album Unwritten
- B-side: "The One That Got Away"
- Released: 16 August 2004
- Genre: Pop; R&B
- Length: 3:36
- Label: Phonogenic
- Songwriters: Natasha Bedingfield; Steve Kipner; Andrew Frampton; Wayne Wilkins
- Producers: Steve Kipner; Andrew Frampton; Wayne Wilkins

Natasha Bedingfield singles chronology
"Single" (2004)	"These Words" (2004)	"Unwritten" (2004)

Music video
- "These Words" on YouTube

"These Words" (also known as "These Words (I Love You, I Love You)") is a song by British singer and songwriter Natasha Bedingfield. It was written by Steve Kipner, Andrew Frampton, Wayne Wilkins and Bedingfield for her 2004 debut album, Unwritten. The song is the album's opening track, and was released as its second single. "These Words" details Bedingfield's lack of inspiration and her reaction to pressure from her record label to produce a successful song.

"These Words" was released as the album's second international single and as the lead single in North America. The single topped the charts in Ireland, Poland and the United Kingdom while reaching the top 10 in Australia, Austria, Croatia, Germany, Hungary, the Netherlands, New Zealand, Norway, Sweden, and Switzerland. It was certified platinum in the Australia, New Zealand, and the United Kingdom, and was nominated for Best British Single at the 2005 BRIT Awards. The song was very well received by music critics, and was frequently deemed a highlight of the album.

== Background and writing ==
Natasha Bedingfield began recording her debut album Unwritten in mid-2003, following the signing of a recording contract with Sony BMG earlier that year. She was determined not to be shaped into "some music biz pigeonhole" and wanted to write songs that were "organic, different and real". Bedingfield began collaborating with Steve Kipner, Andrew Frampton and Wayne Wilkins in London and Los Angeles, but their sessions were largely unproductive due to Bedingfield's writer's block and the pressure that she felt to produce a hit song. Frustrated, she began to sing "I love you, I love you, I love you" over and over. She was at "wit's end and just wanted to say what I meant in a simple way, without using all those flowery words." The line that Bedingfield sang out of frustration became the song "These Words"' hook and its subject matter inspired by her real life difficulty writing a love song.

== Critical reception ==
"These Words" was generally very well received by contemporary pop music critics. Playlouder's Daniel Robson described the song as a "compelling chunk of popply joy", while AllMusic wrote that the track was "near-perfect" and merged "the rhythms and flavors of hip-hop and R&B with unique melodies and Bedingfield's vocal confidence". The BBC called it a "classic love song" with a "really catchy tune", and commented that it was worthy of reaching number one on the UK singles chart. Josh Timmermann of Stylus Magazine called it "best single so far this year", and David Welsh of musicOMH.com wrote that the song had a "virally-infectious chorus and (relatively) clever wordplay."

Stylus Magazine's Colin Cooper ranked "These Words" at number thirteen on his list of the Top 20 Singles of 2004 and About.com ranked the song at number five on its list of the Top 10 Most Memorable Pop Song Lyrics 2005. The website wrote that Bedingfield's naming of the famous poets George Byron, Percy Bysshe Shelley, and John Keats in the song enables the listener to "almost hear the classic poetry over a drum machine" as Bedingfield sings.

Bedingfield's mispronunciation of "hyperbole" as "hyperbowl" has been regularly pointed out throughout the years, including in The Guardian ten years after the song's release.

== Commercial performance ==
"These Words" entered the UK Singles Chart on 22 August 2004 at number one selling 68,745 copies in its first week, remaining on the chart for 13 weeks. It maintained the number one position for two weeks. In the United Kingdom, Bedingfield and her brother, pop-singer Daniel Bedingfield, became the first siblings to achieve separate number one singles. The track also charted at number one in Ireland, remaining on the singles chart for 17 weeks.

Across Europe, "These Words" was largely successful, reaching number one in Poland, number two in Austria, Germany and Norway, and the top 10 in the Netherlands, Sweden and Switzerland. Elsewhere, the song peaked within the top 10 on the majority of the charts it entered. In Australia, "These Words" debuted at number six and reached a peak position of number five three weeks later. On the 2004 ARIA end of the year chart, the song charted at number 49 and was certified gold. In New Zealand the single performed stronger, reaching number two on the singles chart.

"These Words" also performed well in North America. The single debuted at number 100 on the Billboard Hot 100 on 2 July 2005 and reached a peak position of number 17, remaining on the chart for 20 weeks. The song did even better on pop-oriented charts, reaching number nine on the Pop 100 and number 10 on the Mainstream Top 40 chart. "These Words" was helped on the Hot 100 by its strong digital downloads, peaking at number seven on the Hot Digital Songs chart. The single had crossover success in the dance charts, reaching number one on the Hot Dance Airplay chart and number 35 on the Hot Dance Club Play chart.

== Music videos ==
Two music videos were produced for the international and North American markets.

=== International version ===
The song's international music video was directed by Scott Lyon and Sophie Muller and premiered in July 2004. The video features several sequences. It opens with Bedingfield sitting at a table in her Spanish villa, in Málaga, frustrated by her inability to find inspiration to write a song. Afterwards, there are multiple scenes which include her walking and dancing through the villa in colorful outfits, sitting by the swimming pool, lying on the beach and being surrounded by dancing chairs, dancing radios, dancing books in the library, and multiple versions of herself on a sofa. The video concludes with Bedingfield scribbling in her notebook on the roof of her villa. Her scribblings lead her boyfriend to her home where she goes to the balcony, telling him "I love you, is that okay?".

During each sequence of the video, Bedingfield is wearing different outfits and haircuts, with the only constant being that she is always barefoot.

=== North American version ===
The North American music video was directed by Chris Milk and filmed in Rio de Janeiro, Brazil, in March 2005. The music video, however, was discarded by the record label, though this version won four MVPA Awards. The video begins with Bedingfield waking up next to a boombox, dressing, brushing her teeth and leaving her home with the boombox. While performing on Copacabana beach, she kicks her boombox, which comes alive and begins to dance, and she leaves the beach and walks down the street. The video concludes with Bedingfield arriving back home to a house full of dancing boomboxes in the bedroom.

An alternate version of the North American video was directed by Jim Gable using much of the footage from the original. The boomboxes featured in the video are animated to look like drawings and a performance by Bedingfield in a room with flowing white drapery has been added. The video debuted in June 2005 and proved successful on US video chart programs. It debuted on MTV's Total Request Live on 28 July 2005 at number ten and remained on the program for a total of six days. VH1 ranked the video at number twenty-two on its Top 40 Videos of 2005 countdown.

== Formats and track listings ==
Enhanced CD single

1. "These Words" – 3:34
2. "These Words" (Bimbo Jones Remix) – 6:56
3. "The One That Got Away" – 4:16
4. "Single" (Radio 1's Live Lounge Recording) – 3:19
5. "These Words" (Video)
6. "These Words" (The Making of the Video)

CD single

1. "These Words" – 3:34
2. "Single" (Radio 1's Live Lounge Recording) – 3:19

== Personnel ==
The following people contributed to "These Words".

- Natasha Bedingfield – guitar, lead and backing vocals
- Wayne Wilkins – keyboards, engineering, programming
- Andrew Frampton – keyboards, programming
- Mark "Spike" Stent – mixing

- David Treahearn, Rob Haggart – mixing assistant
- Herb Powers – mastering
- Katherine Lanson – drums

== Charts ==
=== Weekly charts ===
Weekly chart performance for "These Words"
Chart (2004–2005)	Peak position
Australia (ARIA)	5
Austria (Ö3 Austria Top 40)	2
Belgium (Ultratop 50 Flanders)	15
Belgium (Ultratip Bubbling Under Wallonia)	7
Canada CHR/Pop Top 30 (Radio & Records)	3
Canada Hot AC Top 30 (Radio & Records)	6
CIS Airplay (TopHit)	10
CIS Airplay (TopHit) Bimbo Jones remix	35
Croatia (HRT)	3
Europe (Eurochart Hot 100)	3
Finland (Suomen virallinen lista)	18
France (SNEP)	19
Germany (GfK)	2
Hungary (Rádiós Top 40)	10
Ireland (IRMA)	1
Italy (FIMI)	30
Netherlands (Dutch Top 40)	4
Netherlands (Single Top 100)	6
New Zealand (Recorded Music NZ)	2
Norway (VG-lista)	2
Poland (Nielsen Music Control)	1
Romania (Romanian Top 100)	12
Russia Airplay (TopHit)	7
Russia Airplay (TopHit) Bimbo Jones remix	20
Scottish Singles Sales (Official Charts)	1
Spain (Promusicae)	18
Sweden (Sverigetopplistan)	5
Switzerland (Schweizer Hitparade)	8
UK Singles (Official Charts)	1
Ukraine Airplay (TopHit) Bimbo Jones remix	140
US Billboard Hot 100	17
US Adult Pop Airplay (Billboard)	24
US Dance Club Songs (Billboard)	35
US Dance Airplay (Billboard)	1
US Pop Airplay (Billboard)	10
US Pop 100 (Billboard)	9

Weekly chart performance for "These Words" (Badger remix)
Chart (2024)	Peak position
Ireland (IRMA)	16
Netherlands (Single Top 100)	43
New Zealand (Recorded Music NZ)	39
Sweden (Sverigetopplistan)	60
UK Singles (Official Charts)	22
UK Dance (Official Charts)	5
US Hot Dance/Electronic Songs (Billboard)	12

=== Year-end charts ===
2004 year-end chart performance for "These Words"
Chart (2004)	Position
Australia (ARIA)	49
Austria (Ö3 Austria Top 40)	26
Belgium (Ultratop 50 Flanders)	99
CIS Airplay (TopHit)	47
CIS Airplay (TopHit) Bimbo Jones remix	154
Germany (Media Control GfK)	29
Ireland (IRMA)	16
Netherlands (Dutch Top 40)	23
Netherlands (Single Top 100)	66
New Zealand (RIANZ)	29
Russia Airplay (TopHit)	25
Russia Airplay (TopHit) Bimbo Jones remix	86
Sweden (Hitlistan)	35
Switzerland (Schweizer Hitparade)	95
UK Singles (OCC)	17

2005 year-end chart performance for "These Words"
Chart (2005)	Position
US Billboard Hot 100	81
US Adult Top 40 (Billboard)	85
US Hot Dance Airplay (Billboard)	21
US Mainstream Top 40 (Billboard)	39

2024 year-end chart performance for "These Words" (Badger remix)
Chart (2024)	Position
US Hot Dance/Electronic Songs (Billboard)	35

== Certifications ==
Certifications for "These Words"
Region	Certification	Certified units/sales
Australia (ARIA)	Platinum	70,000^{‡}
New Zealand (RMNZ)	2× Platinum	60,000^{‡}
New Zealand (RMNZ) Badger remix	Platinum	30,000^{‡}
Norway (IFPI Norway)	Gold	5,000^{*}
United Kingdom (BPI)	Platinum	600,000^{‡}
United Kingdom (BPI) Badger remix	Gold	400,000^{‡}
United States (RIAA)	Gold	500,000^{^}
^{*} Sales figures based on certification alone.^{^} Shipments figures based on certification alone.^{‡} Sales+streaming figures based on certification alone.

== Release history ==
Release dates and formats for "These Words"
Region	Date	Format	Label	Ref.
United Kingdom	16 August 2004	CD single	Phonogenic	
United Kingdom	13 September 2004	Digital download	Phonogenic	
Germany	13 September 2004	Digital download	Sony	
Germany	27 September 2004	CD single	Sony	
Australia	4 October 2004	CD single	Phonogenic	
United States	9 May 2005	Contemporary hit radio	Epic	
United States	9 August 2005	Digital download	Epic	
Italy	10 May 2024	Radio airplay (Badger remix)	Adaptor	
