= Hillsong Church UK =

- Hillsong Church London logo
- Country: United Kingdom
- Denomination: Hillsong Church
- Website: hillsong.com/uk

History
- Founded: 1992; 34 years ago

Clergy
- Pastor(s): Tim and Nicola Douglass

Hillsong Church UK is a charismatic Christian non-denominational megachurch in the United Kingdom which is a part of Hillsong Church global. Hillsong London, founded as London Christian Life Centre, was the first church planted in the UK by the Sydney-based church, in 1992.

== History ==
The church was planted out of the Hills Christian Life Centre (in Greater Western Sydney, Australia) by Gerard and Sue Keehan in 1992 as the London Christian Life Centre, becoming Hillsong Church London in 2000.

From 2000 to 2002 Hillsong London met in various West End theatres and university halls around London. Towards the end of 2004, it ended a two-year residency in the Mermaid Conference and Events Centre, holding seven services a weekend. It then moved to four services on a Sunday at the Dominion Theatre, which seats around 2,200 people.

In August 2005, Hillsong London began holding services in Leatherhead, Surrey (southwest of London), and in 2011 services commenced in Tonbridge, Kent (southeast of London).

In 2006 Hillsong London drew 3,000 people to the Excel Centre in East London, for the first Hillsong Conference Europe.

On 13 September 2009 Hillsong London held a service at The O2 Arena, to celebrate ten years of the church in London. In 2013, Hillsong London formed the Warehouse Project just outside Millwall FC's stadium, The Den.

Hillsong London has hosted their special Christmas event called "Carols at Wembley Arena" at the SSE Arena, Wembley, with the event sold out in 2015.

In 2017, the Church had an annual gross income of over £18 million, and is registered as a charitable institution with the Charity Commission. The Church has 12 locations in the UK, all in England apart from Edinburgh in Scotland. The services are held in rented accommodation. In 2016, the attendance at the Dominion Theatre was 2,000 people.

In 2019, a new congregation started in Croydon, attracting around 600 attendees.

In June 2020, pastor Gary Clarke was criticised for refusing to comment on the murder of George Floyd in the US, saying "For me, I don’t live in the United States. For me to be railing as a pastor about something that's going on in another country, I’m not really sure that’s going to help anyone". Both Clarke and global founding pastor Brian Houston subsequently apologised for the comments. The global church has been embroiled in a number of other controversies and has been subjected to various criticisms, for example its position on LGBTQI issues.

In February 2021, Tim and Nicola Douglass, formerly of the Melbourne Hillsong church, were appointed as pastors to Hillsong London. They took over from Gary and Cathy Clarke, who were being moved into an international leadership role after the Australian senior pastors Brian and Bobbie Houston were stepping down from their international responsibilities.

== Discography ==
- Shout God's Fame (2004)
- Jesus is (Live) (2006)
- Jesus is (Remix) (2008)
- Hail to the King (2008)

== See also ==
- Christian Life Centre
- Hillsong (disambiguation)
