= We Are Hear =

American record label

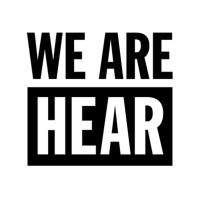
- Industry: Music Industry
- Founded: 2017
- Founder: Linda Perry; Kerry Brown
- Headquarters: Los Angeles
- Website: www.wearehear.com

We Are Hear is a Los Angeles based record label, music publisher, and artist management company founded by producers Linda Perry and Kerry Brown.

== Partnerships ==
We Are Hear has collaborated with artist Kii Arens on several occasions, including hosting his and actor Val Kilmer's exhibit at their headquarters in Studio City, and co-producing a mural on the outside of the Roxy Theatre on the Sunset Strip with Arens and street artist Shepard Fairey.

In 2018, independent music publisher Peermusic announced a joint venture with We Are Hear alongside signing Perry to a global publishing deal.

We Are Hear collaborated with Los Angeles alternative rock radio station KROQ's Kat Corbett to release KROQ Locals Only Vinyl Volume 1, a collection highlighting local music. The records were pressed at a record plant owned by the company in Frogtown.

== Events ==
In 2018, We Are Hear handled music direction for the One Love Malibu festival, a benefit concert which raised relief funds for damage caused by the Woolsey Fire. Performers included Katy Perry, Gwen Stefani, Macy Gray, Chris Martin, Robin Thicke, Natasha Bedingfield, Brandi Carlile, Chad Smith of Red Hot Chili Peppers, Taylor Hawkins of Foo Fighters, Angel Haze, Dorothy, Rita Wilson, Joe Walsh, Brandon Boyd, Mike Einziger and Ben Kenney of Incubus, Best Coast, comedian Whitney Cummings, Nick Valensi of The Strokes, Rick Springfield, Pete Molinari, Kii Arens, Adam Bravin and Cisco Adler. The event raised $1 million, and all proceeds went to the Malibu Foundation and One Love Malibu.

In 2019, We Are Hear curated music for Sean Penn's annual J/P Haitian Relief Organization fundraiser at the Wiltern Theatre. The event, which raised over $3.5 million for the organization, included performances from Billie Eilish, Macy Gray, and Cat Stevens.

== Artists ==
Artists on We Are Hear's label, publishing, and management rosters include:

- Adam Bravin
- Antonio Beliveau
- Dorothy
- Imogen Heap
- Jesse Jo Stark
- JYNX
- Lion
- Natasha Bedingfield
- Pete Molinari
- Terror Jr
- Troy Noka
- Willa Amai
