= Phonogenic Records =

UK record label; imprint of Sony Music Entertainment (UK) Ltd.

Phonogenic Records is a record label currently under the RCA Label Group, a division of Sony Music Entertainment. The label was originally conceived under BMG UK & Ireland. Acts currently signed to the label include: Natasha Bedingfield, Ross Copperman and The Script. Josh Krajcik, who came in second place on The X Factor U.S. in 2011, also signed a deal with Phonogenic Records.

== History ==
Phonogenic was set up in 2003 by Paul Lisberg, who worked in the A&R department of EMI Music Publishing, Tops Henderson, with a background in management; and two songwriters, Andrew Frampton and Steve Kipner. For their first artist, they signed the then-21 year old Natasha Bedingfield. In 2005, The Script signed on to the label. Ross Copperman also joined the label during the early 2000s.

In 2011, they entered into a five-year joint venture agreement with Sony Music Entertainment. As part of the deal the Phonogenic management team assumed responsibility for Sony Music UK's Epic label. Josh Krajcik, who came in second place on "The X Factor" U.S. in 2011, also signed a deal with Phonogenic Records, as they gave him creative freedom. In 2017, Bedingfield left the label to join Linda Perry and Kerry Brown's We Are Hear label.

== See also ==
- Lists of record labels
