= Less Is More Tour =

2011 concert tour by Natasha Bedingfield

- Tour by Natasha Bedingfield
- Promotional ad for 2011 tour
- Associated album: Strip Me
- Start date: 8 June 2011
- End date: 16 July 2011
- Legs: 1
- No. of shows: 29 in North America

Natasha Bedingfield concert chronology
- Verizon VIP Tour (2008); Less Is More Tour (2011)

The Less Is More Tour is the second headlining concert tour by British recording artist Natasha Bedingfield. Primarily visiting the United States, the tour will support the singer's third studio album, Strip Me. Joining Bedingfield on tour will be American recording artists, Andy Grammer, Kevin Hammond, and Kate Voegele, who previously supported Bedingfield on her Verizon VIP Tour (2009). The Less Is More tour is an "intimate" experience, and was to begin in Western Massachusetts on 5 June 2011 and was set to end in South Florida on 16 July 2011.

== Background ==
The tour was announced on Bedingfield's official website on 20 April 2011, concurrent with the release of her third single "Weightless". Sponsored by Freschetta, the tour will primarily visit the United States in the summer of 2011. The singer describes the tour as a "stripped down set in an intimate setting". Bedingfield plans to perform tracks from her latest LP, along with a few of her hits to an acoustic sound. The singer will perform in nightclubs and theatres to provide the concerts the intimate feeling she desires. Singer-songwriter Kate Voegele (who opened for Bedingfield on her previous outing), will join Bedingfield at select concerts. Newcomers to the music scene, Andy Grammer and Kevin Hammond, will also serve as the opening acts. During a recent interview, Bedingfield expressed her desire to work with Victoria Beckham. She stated she would like Beckham to design the costumes for her to wear on tour.

To introduce the tour, Bedingfield stated,

"I'm so excited and ready to go back on tour in the U.S. to celebrate this new album. I always find inspiration in performing for my fans. […]There's just something about being on the road and singing my songs live that is refreshing. It reminds me of why this is what I absolutely love."

== Critical reception ==
Dave McKenna from The Washington Post gave the tour a mixed to negative review commenting that Bedingfield's Brit Pop proves that "less is not always more." In his review, McKenna felt that the show gets off to a slow start, but that there were good moments e.g. the show coming to life when she sings "Try" and Bedingfield's bombastic cover of "Purple Rain." He concluded that "Bedingfield then left her fans wanting more, not less." Marc Hirsh from The Boston Globe noted that Bedingfield struggled to fill "a modest-sized theatre" at her show in Somerville, but said that Bedingfield had the last laugh as he performance was strong enough to rub in their faces. Amongst Hirsh's positive comments was praise for the four-piece band, whom Hirsh said "[successfully] backed [Bedingfield] without extraneous frills but still managed to offer plenty of color."

== Opening acts ==
- Andy Grammer
- Kevin Hammond (Philadelphia, Minneapolis and Myrtle Beach)
- Kate Voegele (select dates)

== Setlist ==
1. "Neon Lights"
2. "Little Too Much"
3. "These Words"
4. "All I Need"
5. "Message in a Bottle"
6. "Single"
7. "I Bruise Easily"
8. "Strip Me"
9. "Run-Run-Run"
10. "Can't Fall Down"
11. "Angel"
12. "Soulmate"
13. "Wild Horses"
14. "Try"
15. "Purple Rain"
16. "Pocketful of Sunshine" (contains excerpts from "We're All Mad")
17. "Love Like This"
18. "Put Your Arms Around Me"
19. "Weightless"
20. "Recover"
21. "Unwritten"

Additional notes

- During the concert in New York City, Bedingfield performed "Hot in Herre", "Single Ladies (Put a Ring on It)" and "Hold It Against Me".
- During the concert in Alexandria, Bedingfield performed "What's My Name?" and "Sex on Fire".
- During the concert in Minneapolis, Bedingfield performed "Smooth Operator". The song was also performed in Seattle and Fort Lauderdale.
- During the concert in Seattle, Bedingfield performed "Big Yellow Taxi".
- During the concert in Los Angeles, Bedingfield performed "What's My Name?", "Single Ladies (Put a Ring on It)" and "Let It Rock".
- During the concert in Anaheim, Bedingfield performed "Baby Mine".
- During the concert in Tampa, Bedingfield performed "Ray of Light.

== Tour dates ==
Date	City	Country	Venue
North America
5 June 2011	Northampton	United States	Pearl Street Nightclub
8 June 2011	Somerville	United States	Somerville Theatre
10 June 2011	New York City	United States	Irving Plaza
12 June 2011	Philadelphia	United States	Theatre of Living Arts
13 June 2011	Alexandria	United States	The Birchmere
15 June 2011	Pontiac	United States	Crofoot Ballroom
16 June 2011	Chicago	United States	House of Blues
17 June 2011	Milwaukee	United States	Pabst Theater
18 June 2011	Minneapolis	United States	First Avenue
20 June 2011^{[A]}	Des Moines	United States	Simon Estes Riverfront Amphitheater
22 June 2011	Englewood	United States	Gothic Theatre
23 June 2011	Salt Lake City	United States	The State Room
25 June 2011	Portland	United States	Aladdin Theatre
26 June 2011	Seattle	United States	Showbox at the Market
28 June 2011	San Francisco	United States	Slim's
29 June 2011	Los Angeles	United States	House of Blues
1 July 2011	Anaheim	United States	House of Blues
2 July 2011	San Diego	United States	House of Blues
3 July 2011	Las Vegas	United States	House of Blues
4 July 2011	Scottsdale	United States	Martini Ranch
6 July 2011	Dallas	United States	House of Blues
7 July 2011	Houston	United States	House of Blues
9 July 2011	St. Louis	United States	Old Rock House
10 July 2011	Nashville	United States	Exit/In
11 July 2011	Atlanta	United States	Center Stage Theater
13 July 2011	North Myrtle Beach	United States	House of Blues
14 July 2011	Tampa	United States	The Ritz Ybor
15 July 2011	Orlando	United States	House of Blues
16 July 2011	Fort Lauderdale	United States	Culture Room

Festivals and other miscellaneous performances
^{A} This concert is a part of the "Nighfall on the River" concert series
