= Strip Me =

- North American edition cover

Studio album by Natasha Bedingfield
- Released: 7 December 2010
- Recorded: 2008–2010
- Studios: Enemy Dojo (Calabasas, California); Patriot (Denver, Colorado); Henson Recording Studios, Sage, Sound Studios (Hollywood, California); The Galt Line (North Hollywood, California); John's Country Bunker, Hit and Run (Los Angeles, California); Avatar, Rodeo Recording (New York City, New York); Sub Zero (Santa Monica, California); Sweatbox (Topanga, California); Sphere (London, England)
- Genres: Pop; R&B
- Length: 48:59 (Strip Me); 56:04 (Strip Me Away)
- Labels: Epic; Phonogenic
- Producers: Marshall Altman; Natasha Bedingield; Julian Bunetta; Andrew Frampton; John Hill; Steve Kipner; Kleerup; John Shanks; Ryan Tedder; Wayne Wilkins

Natasha Bedingfield chronology
Pocketful of Sunshine (2008)	Strip Me (2010)	Roll with Me (2019)

Singles from Strip Me
- 1. "Touch" Released: 18 May 2010; 2. "Strip Me" Released: 31 August 2010

Strip Me Away
- European edition cover

Strip Me is the third studio album by the English singer and songwriter Natasha Bedingfield. It was released on 7 December 2010 by Phonogenic Records. "Touch" was released as the first single from the album on 18 May 2010 and "Strip Me" was released as the second single on 31 August 2010. Neither of the singles was successful on the US Billboard charts. The album's title song peaked at number twenty-three on the adult contemporary chart. The album debuted at number 103 on US Billboard 200 with 10,000 copies sold, a significant drop from her previous album, N.B., which debuted at number three selling 50,000 units.

In Europe, Strip Me was released in May 2011 under the title Strip Me Away, with more colourful artwork and an expanded list of tracks. It charted only in Germany and Switzerland.

== Background and production ==
Bedingfield finished recording the album in July 2010. The project's title was unveiled on Bedingfield's official Twitter page on 15 July 2010. She described the album as "be[ing] the next level from what I've already done....It's just more vibrant and exciting. And I can't wait for people to hear it." In an interview with Billboard, Bedingfield said,

"I've titled the album Strip Me because its about stripping down who we are as humans. We're united about our needs, our desires and our pain, all the different things we go through together. Strip Me felt like it explains what the songs are about more than any other title I could think of. So it has a double meaning, but I think people kind of know me enough to know what I mean by it.

The thirteen-track standard edition, the twenty-one track deluxe edition and pre-order bonus track editions of the album were compiled from more than 50 songs which Bedingfield had written since touring. In an interview with PopEater she said, "I've been touring for so many years now that I wrote with my live gigs in mind. I wanted to write anthems that people could sing along to – things that were still personal, but definitely trying to find the best way to connect with people." On the album, she worked with Andreas Kleerup, John Hill, Wyclef Jean, Salaam Remi, Ryan Tedder, Jonas Myrin, Eg White, and Sia. None of the songs worked on with Jean, Remi or Furler made the final track listing, although all of the songs on the final track list were co-written by Bedingfield. Additionally, Idolator revealed that Bedingfield had recorded a Ne-Yo-assisted duet titled "The Little Things", which was produced by StarGate, though it was not included on the final album either. Bedingfield told fans in December 2010, via a recorded video message, that the album could be released elsewhere in the world later but for the near present she was focusing on America.

== Promotion ==
Bedingfield's label, Epic Records, outlined plans for her to tour in the second half of 2010, in support of the album. However, in September 2010, Billboard revealed that Bedingfield's tour plans were moved back into 2011 though no dates were confirmed. Additionally, the singer announced that "Touch" would be used in TV commercials for Nivea skin care. The album track "Can't Fall Down" was exclusively streamed via Billboard's official website on 3 December 2010. Another song from the album, "Weightless", was made available to stream on the E! Online website. Bedingfield promoted the album with performances of the title song on The Today Show on 7 December, Live with Regis and Kelly on 8 December, The Tonight Show with Jay Leno on 9 December 2010 as well as appearances on Chelsea Lately and Rachel Ray. She was also announced on the line-up for Dick Clark's New Year's Rockin' Eve concert hosted by Ryan Seacrest. According to AOL online, Bedingfield also signed a promotion deal with Hotel Indigo which would see cross promotion of the hotel chain and album. In January 2011, Bedingfield was invited to the head offices of Rolling Stone magazine, where she performed "Pocketful of Sunshine", "Soulmate" and "Strip Me". To promote the album, Bedingfield announced her Less is More Tour, which began on 5 June and included 29 US cities. The deluxe version of Strip Me subsequently included several audio and video recordings from the Less is More Tour dates.

"Strip Me" and "A Little Too Much" became official theme songs for the films Morning Glory and Something Borrowed respectively, being used in both the trailers and in the films' ending credits. "Neon Lights" was used in the end credits of the 2011 film What's Your Number?. "Recover" was later used to help promote State Farm in their State of Despair TV spot.

== Singles ==
"Touch" was the album's lead single. The up-tempo song was written by Bedingfield, Julian Bunetta, and Steve Kipner, and produced by Bunetta and Kipner, It was released to the iTunes Store on 18 May 2010. It was sent to US mainstream radio stations on 29 June 2010. The song peaked on the Canadian Hot 100 at number sixty. However, it was later declared a buzz single by Bedingfield's official website and the album's "Strip Me" was revealed as the replacement lead single. "Strip Me" was released to mainstream radio stations on 31 August 2010 and digital download on 21 September 2010. "Strip Me" was moderately more successful, reaching number sixty-five in Canada and number ninety-one on the Billboard Hot 100.

== Critical reception ==
Professional ratings
Aggregate scores
Source	Rating
Metacritic	60/100
Review scores
Source	Rating
AllMusic	3/5 stars
California Chronicle	3/5 stars
Entertainment Weekly	(C)
Rolling Stone	3.5/5 stars
Slant Magazine	2/5 stars

At Metacritic, which assigns a normalised rating out of 100 to reviews from mainstream critics, the album received a weighted average score of 60, based on 4 reviews, which indicates "mixed or average reviews". Mikael Wood of Entertainment Weekly gave Strip Me a C rating and wrote that it "plays like one long, increasingly desperate pep talk. The only breather? 'Unexpected Hero,' a lovely late-Beatles-style ballad." The AllMusic editor, Stephen Thomas Erlewine, noted the album for "retaining [the] same blend of well-manicured R&B and European sophistication" of Bedingfield's first album and commented that she "plays it exceptionally safe, to the extent that she even tones down the self-empowerment of her first two records, preferring pristine blue-eyed soul and adult contemporary ballads, all tailored for an aspirational upscale lifestyle". Slant Magazine's Jonathon Keefe found it "single-minded in its uplifting, inspirational tone", writing in conclusion that "Bedingfield uses her powerful voice to oversing most of her material, making Strip Me feel like even more of a sermon. It may not be the year's worst pop album, but it might just be the most exhausting and heavy-handed."

== Commercial performance ==
Strip Me was originally due to be released on 9 November 2010; however, it was pushed back to 7 December 2010. It was Bedingfield's third album to be released in the United States and Canada and the second release by Bedingfield to be released exclusively in those territories, following Pocketful of Sunshine in 2008. On 16 December 2010, the album made its US Billboard 200 chart debut at number 103, having sold just under 10,000 copies. It was a significant decline compared to Pocketful of Sunshine (2008), which debuted at number three having sold 50,000 copies. It remained in the top 200 for just its opening week; but re-appeared in 2011, on 15 January, at number 167, and climbed to number 157 the following week.

== Track listing ==
=== Strip Me ===
Strip Me – Standard edition
No.	Title	Writer(s)	Producer(s)	Length
1.	"Little Too Much"	Natasha Bedingfield; John Hill; Jonas Myrin	Hill	3:30
2.	"All I Need" (featuring Kevin Rudolf)	Bedingfield; Danielle Brisebois; John Shanks; Rudolf	Shanks	3:45
3.	"Strip Me"	Bedingfield; Ryan Tedder; Wayne Wilkins	Wilkins; Tedder; Bedingfield	3:29
4.	"Neon Lights"	Bedingfield; Tedder; Wilkins	Wilkins; Tedder; Bedingfield	3:44
5.	"Weightless"	Bedingfield; Steve Kipner; Wilkins; Andre Merritt	Wilkins; Kipner; Bedingfield	3:55
6.	"Can't Fall Down"	Bedingfield; Kipner; Andrew Frampton; Wilkins	Wilkins; Frampton; Kipner; Bedingfield	4:09
7.	"Try"	Bedingfield; Brisebois; Shanks	Shanks	3:16
8.	"Touch"	Bedingfield; Kipner; Julian Bunetta	Bunetta; Kipner	3:47
9.	"Run-Run-Run"	Bedingfield; Hill; Myrin	Hill	3:06
10.	"Break Thru"	Bedingfield; Andreas Kleerup; Myrin	Kleerup; Bedingfield (vocal)	4:07
11.	"No Mozart"	Bedingfield; Kipner; Frampton; Wilkins	Wilkins; Frampton; Kipner; Bedingfield	3:48
12.	"Recover"	Bedingfield; Eg White	Marshall Altman	3:49
13.	"Weightless" (Less Is More Version)	Bedingfield; Kipner; Wilkins; Merritt	Altman	4:31
Total length:				48:49

Strip Me – iTunes Store edition (bonus track)
No.	Title	Writer(s)	Producer(s)	Length
14.	"Easy" (Rascal Flatts featuring Natasha Bedingfield)	Katrina Elam; Mike Mobley	Rascal Flats; Dann Huff	3:39
Total length:				52:28

Strip Me – iTunes Store pre-order edition (bonus track)
No.	Title	Writer(s)	Producer(s)	Length
14.	"Unexpected Hero"	Bedingfield; Daniel Carey	Carey	3:22
Total length:				52:11

Strip Me – Deluxe edition (bonus tracks)
No.	Title	Length
14.	"Easy" (Rascal Flatts feat. Natasha Bedingfield)	3:39
15.	"Strip Me" (Less Is More Version)	3:45
16.	"All I Need" (Less Is More Version)	4:32
17.	"Can't Fall Down" (Less Is More Version)	4:26
18.	"Strip Me" (Less Is More Version) (music video)	3:53
19.	"All I Need" (Less Is More Version) (music video)	3:53
20.	"Can't Fall Down" (Less Is More Version) (music video)	4:22
21.	"Weightless" (Less Is More Version) (music video)	4:39
Total length:		79:58

=== Strip Me Away ===
Outside of North America, Strip Me was released under the title Strip Me Away, with an amended track listing.

Strip Me Away – Standard edition
No.	Title	Writer(s)	Producer(s)	Length
1.	"Pocketful of Sunshine"	Bedingfield; Brisebois; Shanks	Shanks	3:23
2.	"Little Too Much"	Bedingfield; Hill; Myrin	Hill	3:30
3.	"All I Need" (featuring Kevin Rudolf)	Bedingfield; Brisebois; Rudolf; Shanks	Shanks	3:45
4.	"Strip Me"	Bedingfield; Tedder; Wilkins	Bedingfield; Tedder; Wilkins	3:29
5.	"Neon Lights"	Bedingfield; Tedder; Wilkins	Bedingfield; Tedder; Wilkins	3:44
6.	"Weightless"	Bedingfield; Kipner; Merritt; Wilkins	Bedingfield; Kipner; Wilkins	3:55
7.	"Can't Fall Down"	Bedingfield; Frampton; Kipner; Wilkins	Bedingfield; Kipner; Wilkins	4:09
8.	"Try"	Bedingfield; Brisebois; Shanks	Shanks	3:16
9.	"Touch"	Bedingfield; Bunetta; Kipner	Bunetta; Kipner	3:47
10.	"Run-Run-Run"	Bedingfield; Hill; Myrin	Hill	3:06
11.	"Break Thru"	Bedingfield; Kleerup; Myrin	Kleerup	4:07
12.	"No Mozart"	Bedingfield; Frampton; Kipner; Wilkins	Frampton; Kipner; Wilkins	3:48
13.	"Recover"	Bedingfield; White	Altman	3:49
14.	"Weightless" (Less Is More Version)	Bedingfield; Kipner; Merritt; Wilkins	Altman	4:31
15.	"Put Your Arms Around Me"	Bedingfield; Kipner; Frampton; Wilkins	Bedingfield; Kipner; Frampton; Wilkins	3:43
16.	"Unexpected Hero"	Bedingfield; Carey	Carey	3:22
Total length:				56:04

Strip Me Away – Germany iTunes Store edition (bonus tracks)
No.	Title	Writer(s)	Producer(s)	Length
17.	"Piece of Your Heart"	Bedingfield; Jonathan Rotem; Brisebois	J. R. Rotem	3:47
18.	"Unwritten" (acoustic) (featuring Carney)			3:44
19.	"Pocketful of Sunshine" (music video)

Strip Me Away – Deluxe edition (bonus DVD)
No.	Title	Length
1.	"Strip Me" (Less Is More Version)
2.	"Weightless" (Less Is More Version)
3.	"Can't Fall Down" (Less Is More Version)
4.	"Run-Run-Run" (Less Is More Version)
5.	"Pocketful of Sunshine" (music video)
6.	"Strip Me" (music video)

Sample credits

- "All I Need" contains samples and excerpts from "Let It Rock" by Kevin Rudolf.

== Personnel ==
Taken from Barnes & Noble.

Performance credits

- Natasha Bedingfield – lead vocals
- Steve Kipner – percussion
- Vinnie Colaiuta – drums
- Nick Lashley – guitar
- John Shanks – bass guitar, guitar, keyboards
- David Glass – guitar, percussion, ukulele
- Marshall Altman – percussion
- Curt Schneider – bass guitar
- Wayne Wilkins – keyboards
- Michael Chaves – acoustic guitar, electric guitar
- Zac Rae – banjo, piano, keyboards, xylophone, Wurlitzer
- Andrew Frampton – bass guitar, guitar
- David Levita – acoustic guitar, electric guitar
- Ryan Tedder – guitar, keyboards
- Aaron Sterling – percussion, drums
- Jonas Myrin – keyboards
- Kleerup – guitar, keyboards, sounds
- John Hill – guitar
- Jess Collins – background vocals
- Charlie Judge – keyboards
- Eric Robinson – electric guitar

Technical credits

- Steve Kipner – producer
- Lars Fox – Pro-Tools
- John Shanks – producer
- David Glass – engineer, vocal engineer
- Marshall Altman – arranger, programming, producer
- Wayne Wilkins – programming, producer, engineer
- Noel Zancanella – engineer
- Andrew Frampton – producer
- Jeff Rothschild – programming, engineer, drum programming
- Björn Yttling – string arrangements
- Ryan Tedder – programming, producer
- Natasha Bedingfield – producer, executive producer, vocal producer
- Julian Bunetta – producer, instrumentation
- Kleerup – producer, beats
- John Hill – programming, producer, instrumentation
- Brian "Big Bass" Gardner – mastering
- Eric Robinson – engineer
- Henrik Gustafsson – engineer
- Calle Bagge – string arrangements

== Charts ==
Chart (2010–2011)	Peak position
German Albums (Offizielle Top 100)	45
Swiss Albums (Schweizer Hitparade) Strip Me Away	42
US Billboard 200	103

== Release history ==
List of release dates, showing region, edition, format, record label, catalog number and reference.
Region	Date	Edition	Format(s)	Label(s)	Catalog	Ref.
Canada	7 December 2010	Standard	CD; digital download	Sony Music	886977442222	
Canada	7 December 2010	Deluxe	Digital download	Sony Music	886977442223	
United States	7 December 2010	Standard	CD; digital download	Epic; Phonogenic	886977442222	
United States	7 December 2010	Deluxe	Digital download	Epic; Phonogenic	886977442223	
Austria	13 May 2011	Strip Me Away	CD; CD+DVD; digital download	Sony Music	88697912292	
Germany	13 May 2011	Strip Me Away	CD; CD+DVD; digital download	Sony Music	88697912292	
Switzerland	13 May 2011	Strip Me Away	CD; CD+DVD; digital download	Sony Music	88697912292	
