= Pocketful of Sunshine (album) =

Studio album (reissue) by Natasha Bedingfield
- Released: January 22, 2008
- Recorded: late 2006–late 2007
- Genres: Pop; R&B
- Length: 48:09
- Label: Epic
- Producers: Natasha Bedingfield; Louis Biancaniello; Danja; Mike Elizondo; Andrew Frampton; Toby Gad; Rodney "Darkchild" Jerkins; Steve Kipner; Greg Kurstin; Patrick Leonard; J. R. Rotem; Tom Rothrock; John Shanks; Ryan Tedder; Sam Watters; Wayne Wilkins

Natasha Bedingfield chronology
| N.B. (2007) | Pocketful of Sunshine (2008) | Strip Me (2010) |

Singles from Pocketful of Sunshine
- 1. "Love Like This" Released: 20 September 2007; 2. "Pocketful of Sunshine" Released: 15 January 2008; 3. "Angel" Released: 11 August 2008; 4. "Soulmate" Released: 8 December 2008

Pocketful of Sunshine is the North American and regional reissue of British singer Natasha Bedingfield's second studio album, N.B. (2007). It was released on 22 January 2008, through Epic Records, eight months after the release of its parent album. Primarily a pop and R&B album, Pocketful of Sunshine also incorporates elements of reggae-pop and dance-pop in its production.

The album was originally conceived as the North American release of N.B., but was repeatedly postponed from its initially planned August 2007 release. During this time, Bedingfield continued to work on new material, leading Epic Records to make the decision to release seven new songs alongside six tracks from N.B. as a retitled, repackaged version of the album, titled Pocketful of Sunshine. The album was generally well-received by music critics and was commercially successful, peaking at number 3 on the US Billboard 200 and at 13 on the Canadian albums chart. In both countries, the album was certified gold.

Four singles were released from the album. The lead single, "Love Like This" with Sean Kingston, peaked at number 11 on the US Billboard Hot 100 and at 9 on the Canadian Hot 100. The second single from the album, the title track, was largely successful. In the US, it peaked at number five on the Billboard Hot 100 and was certified double platinum, selling three million downloads and becoming her most successful single there. In Canada, it peaked at number three on Canadian Hot 100 and was certified platinum. The follow-up singles from the album, "Angel" and "Soulmate" did not replicate the success of the first two, but the former was a number one hit on the US Hot Dance Club Play chart.

== Background ==
On 27 April 2007, Bedingfield released her second solo studio album N.B. in Europe. It was initially reported that it would have a North American release in August 2007. However, following the relative commercial disappointment of its first single "I Wanna Have Your Babies" and the album's sales overall, Epic Records chose to delay the release of a single and the album in the United States. On 9 August, the album was delayed to a 30 October release, and it was confirmed that a new track not on N.B. would likely serve as its first single. On 28 September, Billboard reported that the album had been delayed a second time to 18 December. In December, the album was reported to have been retitled Pocketful of Sunshine and delayed to its final release date of 22 January 2008.

Throughout 2007, Bedingfield continued to work on new material which would later be featured on the reissue in favor of older songs. She explained: "What happened is I'd written a whole load of new songs by the time I released the album in the States. I really liked those songs and felt they were better, so I wanted to use them." Epic Records president Charlie Walk noted that "Natasha was in a really different place in her life when she did the U.K. version of the record. Coming to the States and working here really influenced her sound." Epic head of marketing Scott Greer also noted that "she came off her tour [...] with a bunch of great new songs, and we certainly weren't going to tell her she should just put them on the back burner and wait for the next record." A UK release of the Pocketful of Sunshine album was planned following the UK single release of "Love Like This" in April 2008, but these plans did not come to fruition.

== Singles ==
"Love Like This", featuring Sean Kingston, was released on 25 September 2007 as the lead single from the album. It was released for online music stores on 2 October 2007. The single was a top twenty hit in the United States, reaching number eleven on the Billboard Hot 100 and number ten on the Pop 100. The single was released in the United Kingdom on 7 April 2008. "Pocketful of Sunshine" was released on 15 January 2008. The single reached number five on the Billboard Hot 100, becoming Bedingfield's second top ten single. It also peaked at number three on the Canadian Hot 100.

"Angel" was released on 11 August 2008. It reached number sixty-three on the US Billboard Hot 100, number thirty-five on the US Pop 100, number one on the US Hot Dance Club Play and number forty-one on the Canadian Hot 100. "Soulmate", previously released as the second single from N.B., was released as the fourth single from Pocketful of Sunshine on 9 December 2008. Bedingfield performed the song in a medley at the American Music Awards of 2008 and on Dancing with the Stars. The song peaked at number ninety-six on the US Billboard Hot 100.

== Critical reception ==
Professional ratings
Aggregate scores
| Source | Rating |
|---|---|
| Metacritic | 65/100 |
Review scores
| Source | Rating |
| About.com | 3/5 stars |
| AllMusic | 3.5/5 stars |
| Blender | 3.5/5 stars |
| Entertainment Weekly | B− |
| Common Sense Media | 4/5 stars |
| Los Angeles Times | 2.5/4 stars |
| Robert Christgau | C+ |
| Rolling Stone | 3/5 stars |

Pocketful of Sunshine received generally positive reviews from music critics. At Metacritic, which assigns a normalised rating out of 100 to reviews from mainstream critics, the album received an average score of 65, which indicates "generally favorable reviews", based on 14 reviews. Many critics compared the album to N.B., but were divided on which album they felt was stronger. Matthew Chisling from AllMusic wrote that the album was "geared perfectly toward the mainstream American market [...] compared to its international counterpart, the album [is] packed with more potential singles, a sunnier disposition, and a much more radio-friendly sound". Kerri Mason from Billboard felt that "all the tinkering" gave the album "individuality, albeit of the programmed kind" but also wrote that "the album has an undeniable flip-flop feel throughout." Writing for the Los Angeles Times, Ann Powers praised Bedingfield for "trying to make adult dance pop that’s not overly promiscuous" but was disappointed that "I Wanna Have Your Babies" was not included the album, noting that "as awkward as the song is, it fleshes out Bedingfield's vision better than Jerkins' Mary J. Blige 'Angel' or Rotem's Fergalicious 'Piece of Your Heart'". Christian Hoard of Rolling Stone wrote that "Bedingfield doesn't have much to say", but commented that "the packaging in which she wraps her openhearted thoughts makes Sunshine a decent little pop record".

In a review for N.B., Stewart Mason from AllMusic described Pocketful of Sunshine as "awkwardly assembled", and added that it "feels inorganic in a way that Unwritten did not, less personal and more vetted by various A&R executives". Bill Lamb of About.com noted that the album "is simply another professional, corporately polished pop record. [The] songs and vocals are reasonably solid, but it's hard to hear inspiration." Glenn Gambo from Newsday gave the album C+ rating, and wrote that the album "barely registers" and was "full of pale copies of other successful pop [songs] that don't necessarily work for Bedingfield".

== Commercial performance ==
Pocketful of Sunshine debuted on the Billboard 200 albums chart in the United States at number three, selling 50,000 copies. The first-week sales surpassed her debut album, Unwritten, which sold 34,000 copies its first week of release. The album has become the third highest debut by a United Kingdom-signed female artist in Billboard history, after Joss Stone, who entered at number two and now Leona Lewis, after her debut at number one. After performing on American Idol, sales of the album and single "Pocketful of Sunshine" increased considerably. The album jumped from number 97 to number 24 on the Billboard 200, while the single charted within the top five on the Billboard charts. The album was certified Gold on 12 December 2008. In Canada, the album debuted at number thirteen.

== Track listing ==
Pocketful of Sunshine – Standard edition
| No. | Title | Writer(s) | Producer(s) | Length |
|---|---|---|---|---|
| 1. | "Put Your Arms Around Me" | Natasha Bedingfield; Steve Kipner; Andrew Frampton; Wayne Wilkins | Bedingfield; Kipner; Frampton; Wilkins | 3:43 |
| 2. | "Pocketful of Sunshine" | Bedingfield; Brisebois; John Shanks | Shanks | 3:23 |
| 3. | "Happy" | Bedingfield; Toby Gad; Meleni Smith | Gad | 3:40 |
| 4. | "Love Like This" (featuring Sean Kingston) | Louis Biancaniello; Richard Bulter Jr.; Ryan Tedder; Sam Watters; Wilkins; Kisean Anderson; Bedingfield | Wilkins; Watters; Tedder; Biancaniello | 3:42 |
| 5. | "Piece of Your Heart" | Bedingfield; Jonathan Rotem; Brisebois | J. R. Rotem | 3:47 |
| 6. | "Soulmate" | Bedingfield; David Tench; Mads Hauge | Patrick Leonard; Bedingfield | 3:34 |
| 7. | "Say It Again" | Bedingfield; Levine; Elizondo | Elizondo | 3:32 |
| 8. | "Angel" | Rodney Jerkins; LaShawn Daniels; Crystal Johnson; Butler Jr. | Jerkins | 4:08 |
| 9. | "Backyard" | Bedingfield; Greg Kurstin | Kurstin; Bedingfield | 3:27 |
| 10. | "Freckles" | Bedingfield; Gad | Gad | 3:46 |
| 11. | "Who Knows" | Bedingfield; Elizondo | Elizondo | 3:46 |
| 12. | "Pirate Bones" | Bedingfield; Kipner; Frampton; Wilkins | Bedingfield; Kipner; Frampton; Wilkins | 3:52 |
| 13. | "Not Givin' Up" | Bedingfield; Hills; Kipner | Danja | 3:49 |
| Total length: | | | | 48:09 |

Pocketful of Sunshine – Japanese edition (bonus track)
| No. | Title | Length |
|---|---|---|
| 14. | "Stepping Stone" | 3:51 |
| Total length: | | 51:06 |

Pocketful of Sunshine – Walmart exclusive edition (bonus tracks)
| No. | Title | Length |
|---|---|---|
| 14. | "Love Like This" (Live at Soundcheck) | 3:30 |
| 15. | "Unwritten" (Live at Soundcheck) |

Pocketful of Sunshine – South Asian digital edition (bonus tracks)
| No. | Title | Length |
|---|---|---|
| 14. | "Love Like This" (Acoustic from Bleu Room) | 3:25 |
| 15. | "Cheer Me Up" | 3:22 |

Pocketful of Sunshine – North American iTunes Store deluxe edition (bonus tracks)
| No. | Title | Length |
|---|---|---|
| 14. | "Unwritten" (Stripped acoustic version) | 4:08 |
| 15. | "Love Like This" (featuring Sean Kingston) (music video) | 3:53 |
| 16. | "Soulmate" (music video) | 3:34 |
| 17. | "These Words" (Director's Cut music video) | 4:05 |
| Total length: | | 59:04 |

Pocketful of Sunshine – North American iTunes Store pre-order edition (bonus tracks)
| No. | Title | Length |
|---|---|---|
| 14. | "Unwritten" (Stripped acoustic version) | 4:08 |
| 15. | "Love Like This" (Acoustic from Bleu Room) | 3:25 |
| 16. | "Cheer Me Up" | 3:22 |

Pocketful of Sunshine – Deluxe edition (bonus tracks)
| No. | Title | Length |
|---|---|---|
| 14. | "Unwritten" (Johnny Vicious Mix) |
| 15. | "The One That Got Away" (Valentin Mix) |
| 16. | "Love Like This" (Johnny Vicious Mix) |
| 17. | "Pocketful of Sunshine" (Stonebridge Mix) |
| 18. | "Angel" (Moto Blanco Mix) |
| 19. | "These Words" (Lenny B Mix) |
| 20. | "Unwritten" (Hani Num Mix) |
| 21. | "Angel" (Chicane Edit) |

Pocketful of Sunshine – Deluxe edition (bonus DVD)
| No. | Title | Length |
|---|---|---|
| 1. | "These Words" (Live in New York City) |
| 2. | "I Bruise Easily" (Live in New York City) |
| 3. | "Single" (Live in New York City) |
| 4. | "Wild Horses" (Live in New York City) |
| 5. | "Unwritten" (Live in New York City) |
| 6. | "Love Like This" (Music video) |
| 7. | "Pocketful of Sunshine" (Music video) |
| 8. | "I Wanna Have Your Babies" (Music video) |
| 9. | "Soulmate" (Music video) |

Notes

- ^a – signifies a vocal producer.
- ^b – signifies a remixer.

== Personnel ==
Adapted from the Pocketful of Sunshine AllMusic credits.

- Natasha Bedingfield – background vocals, vocals, audio producer
- Louis Biancaniello – audio producer, producer
- Danielle Brisebois – backing vocals
- Ravaughn Brown – backing vocals
- Dernst Emile II – various instruments
- Steve Kipner – backing vocals, audio producer, producer
- Richard Love – backing vocals
- Meleni Smith – backing vocals
- Mike Elizondo – audio producer, guitar, bass guitar, bass, programming, keyboards
- Andrew Frampton – backing vocals, keyboards, programming
- Richard Altenbach – orchestra conductor, arranger, strings
- Toby Gad – arranger, audio producer, instrumentation, mixing, producer, programming, various instruments
- Mads Hauge – audio producer, guitars, vocal producer
- Rodney Jerkins – audio producer, various instruments
- J. R. Rotem – instrumentation, arranger
- Greg Kurstin – instrumentation, engineering
- Jack Rothschild – drums, programming, engineering
- John Shanks – guitar, bass guitar, keyboards, backing vocals
- Wayne Wilkins – keyboards, backing vocals, drum programming, keyboard programming
- Robbie Campesinos – vocal arrangements, backing vocals, guitar arrangements
- Trevor Lawrence – drums, cymbals
- Charles Judge – keyboards
- Nick Lashley, Wendy Melvoin – guitar
- Michael Valerio, Kate Bird – bass guitar
- Julie Gigante – violin
- Neel Hammond – violin
- Natalie Leggett – violin
- Mark Robertson – violin
- Keith Greene – viola
- Victor Lawrence – cello
- Sebastian Toettcher – cello
- Jason Pennock – digital editing
- Greg Ogan – engineering, vocal engineering
- Lleyton Blaine – assistant engineer, mixing assistant
- Adam Hawkins, Brian Scheuble – engineering
- Daniel Frampton – vocal engineering
- Keith Gretlein – assistant engineer
- Anne Kasdorf – assistant engineer
- Matt Serrecchio – assistant engineer
- Marcella "Ms. Lago" Araica – mixing
- Manny Marroquin – mixing
- Phil Tan – mixing
- Alex Dromgoole – mixing assistant
- Josh Houghkirk – mixing assistant
- Matt Paul – mixing assistant
- David Kutch – mastering
- John Akehurst – photography
- Michelle Holme – design

== Charts ==
=== Weekly charts ===
Weekly chart performance for Pocketful of Sunshine
| Chart (2008) | Peak position |
|---|---|
| Canadian Albums (Billboard) | 13 |
| US Billboard 200 | 3 |

=== Year-end charts ===
2008 year-end chart performance for Pocketful of Sunshine
| Chart (2008) | Position |
|---|---|
| US Billboard 200 | 88 |

== Certifications ==
Certifications for Pocketful of Sunshine
| Region | Certification | Certified units/sales |
|---|---|---|
| Canada (Music Canada) | Gold | 50,000^{^} |
| New Zealand (RMNZ) | Gold | 7,500^{‡} |
| United States (RIAA) | Gold | 500,000^{^} |
^{^} Shipments figures based on certification alone.^{‡} Sales+streaming figures based on certification alone.

== Release history ==
List of release dates, showing region, edition, format(s), record label(s) and reference(s)
| Region | Date | Edition | Format(s) | Label(s) | Ref. |
|---|---|---|---|---|---|
| Canada | 22 January 2008 | Standard | CD; digital download | Sony BMG Music | |
| United States | 22 January 2008 | Standard | CD; digital download | Epic | |
| Japan | 23 April 2008 | Standard | CD; digital download | Sony BMG Music | |
| Canada | 11 November 2008 | Deluxe | CD+DVD | Sony Music | |
| United States | 11 November 2008 | Deluxe | CD+DVD | Epic | |
