= Veronica (singer) =

American singer (born 1974)

- Born: Veronica Vazquez; July 24, 1974 (age 52)
- Origin: Bronx, New York, U.S.
- Genres: R&B, hip Hop, soul, house
- Occupations: Singer, actress
- Years active: 1995–present
- Labels: H.O.L.A. Recordings; Mercury Records

Veronica (born Veronica Vazquez; July 24, 1974) is an American singer and stage actress. Along with singers Ultra Nate and Deborah Cox, she is considered to be one of the divas of the 1990s club music scene.

== Early life ==
Veronica was born and raised in Bronx, New York to parents from Puerto Rico. She has one younger sister. From an early age she expressed interest in music and singing. As a child, she attended the performing arts program at the Kips Bay Boys & Girls Club, in her neighborhood, which boasts such alumni as actress Kerry Washington and actress/singer Jennifer Lopez, who was also from the same neighborhood. She eventually attended New York City's famous Fiorello H. LaGuardia High School of Music & Art and Performing Arts (also known as High School of Performing Arts), made famous by the 1980s movie, Fame. There she studied vocal music, including being professionally trained in opera.

== Career ==
Veronica began her career in 1995 when she was 21 years old with the release of the lead single "Without Love" released on September 12, 1995 one month prior to the debut album V...As in Veronica which was released on October 24, 1995. The album was a mixture of R&B and Hip Hop and featured production from Rodney Jerkins and Dallas Austin. On October 28, 1997, she released her second album Rise. She released two singles/videos off of this album. The lead single was "No One But You" was released on September 26, 1997, and it featured Craig Mack. The second single and album title track Rise was released on December 9, 1997, and that featured guest vocals by Big Pun & Cuban Link.

As one of the first artists to sign to H.O.L.A. Recordings, a label founded by music producer Jellybean Benitez, Veronica had a string of hits on the Billboard Hot Dance Music/Club Play chart, including three which reached the top ten. The third single "Let Me Go... Release Me" was released on March 27, 1998, and landed the number one spot in 1998, and soon afterwards it was followed by the club anthem "Someone to Hold", the albums' fifth single, released on June 21, 1998 (which peaked at the number two slot) which was remixed by producer Johnny Vicious and played heavily in the club circuit scene. The song still remains a classic among clubgoers today and it was featured on the soundtrack to the independent film Trick released in 1999 and starred Christian Campbell and Tori Spelling. She scored a second number one dance hit in 2000 with her cover of Evelyn "Champagne" King's classic R&B song "I'm in Love", which was re-recorded for a club setting. It was the albums' sixth and final single of the Rise album and released at a later time, on June 2, 2000. She remains a very popular singer to this very day among gay audiences and especially in the club circuit scene. Unfortunately, the albums' fourth single, "60 Wayz" released on April 14, 1998, did not chart.

She was part of the 2005 reading of Lin Manuel Miranda’s 2008 Broadway hit In The Heights, playing the role of Vanessa García.

She moved away from New York and the club music scene for a few years. During these years, she pursued her love for musical theater and was given the opportunity to portray slain Tejano singer Selena in a travelling production about her life and times. The production, titled Selena Forever traveled to numerous cities with a large Mexican-American population for over a year. Shortly after the successful run of the production, she decided to return to New York and start a family and return to her love of music. In 2004, Veronica recorded a song with rapper Triple Seis titled "Krazy". The song was featured on Triple Seis' debut album Time'll Tell. After a brief hiatus, Veronica returned in 2006, with music producer Tim Rex on her first dance single in over five years, "Relentless...Just a Game". She can be seen in the 2007 film The Singer where she plays Héctor Lavoe's mother in his younger years.

In 2021, Veronica recorded the song "Out of My Dreams" for the film adaptation of the Jonathan Larson musical Tick, Tick...Boom!

== Personal life ==
She presently resides in New York City with her husband, Christopher Jackson, who starred in Hamilton, their son, C.J. and daughter Jadelyn. After her son was diagnosed with autism, Veronica has become an advocate for research and has led several efforts, including charitable walks, to raise research funds and awareness for the condition.

== See also ==
- List of number-one dance hits (United States)
- List of artists who reached number one on the US Dance chart
