= Angel (Natasha Bedingfield song) =

Single by Natasha Bedingfield

from the album Pocketful of Sunshine
- Released: 11 August 2008
- Recorded: 2007
- Genre: Pop; R&B
- Length: 4:08
- Label: Phonogenic; Epic
- Songwriters: LaShawn Daniels; Dernst Emile; Rodney "Darkchild" Jerkins; Crystal Johnson; Richard Butler
- Producer: Darkchild

Natasha Bedingfield singles chronology
"Bruised Water" (2008)	"Angel" (2008)	"Touch" (2010)

Music video
- "Angel" on YouTube

"Angel" is a song by English singer-songwriter Natasha Bedingfield for her second North American album Pocketful of Sunshine (2008). It was released as the album's third single in North America on 11 August 2008. The song was produced by Rodney "Darkchild" Jerkins, hence the "Darkchild forever" line at the beginning of the song, he also sings the chorus.

The song is written in the key of B minor and set in 4/4 time. Bedingfield's vocals range from F♯_{3} to C♯_{5}. It utilizes a prominent spelling out of the word 'angel' as its hook. In the song, Bedingfield sings of being a guardian angel of sorts for her companion, stating in the chorus, "I'll be your A-N-G-E-L." On 18 September 2008 she performed the song live on America's Got Talent. This song is featured in the rhythmic, singing video game Boogie Superstar, but only as the Moto Blanco Club Remix and as an online exclusive song.

== Critical reception ==
Chris Williams of Billboard praised "Angel", noting that it takes on "a decidedly more urban slant", and saying, "Vocally, Bedingfield has no difficulty adjusting to the production, confidently delivering with sass and swagger." He also thought the track would do well, claiming, "With angelic harmonies throughout, a catchy chorus with a fun spell-out of "a-n-g-e-l" and a sing-rap bridge, Bedingfield is on her way again to the airwaves' high heavens."

== Chart performance ==
"Angel" debuted on the Billboard Hot 100 at #93, the chart week of 4 October 2008. It has debuted on the Pop 100 at #91, and has climbed to #35. Since its release date it has been one of the most added tracks at U.S. Mainstream Top 40 radio. It has already climbed to #25 on BDS CHR/Top 40 chart. The song debuted at #96 on the Canadian Hot 100 and peaked at #41.

== Music video ==
Phil Griffin shot the music video for the song. The video features Bedingfield in several different rooms and outfits, with multiple versions of her suddenly appearing and then disappearing. The music video uses the Radio Edit of the song which alters the bridge: the lyrics "I wish somebody would disrespect my man, they gon' have to come see me. I go hard for my baby..." being changed to "if someone ever should disrespect my love, they gon' have to come see me. I fight hard for my baby..."

== Charts ==
Chart (2008)	Peak position
Canada Hot 100 (Billboard)	41
Canada CHR/Top 40 (Billboard)	35
Canada Hot AC (Billboard)	25
US Billboard Hot 100	63
US Pop Airplay (Billboard)	24
US Dance Club Songs (Billboard)	1
US Pop 100 (Billboard)	35

== Release history ==
Release dates and formats for "Angel"
Region	Date	Format(s)	Label(s)	Ref.
United States	11 August 2008	Contemporary hit radio	Epic	
