= Say It Again (Natasha Bedingfield song) =

Promotional single by Natasha Bedingfield

from the album N.B.
- Released: 7 October 2007
- Recorded: 2006
- Genre: Pop rock; R&B
- Length: 3:29
- Label: Phonogenic
- Songwriters: Natasha Bedingfield; Adam Levine; Mike Elizondo
- Producer: Mike Elizondo

"Say It Again" is a pop song written by Natasha Bedingfield, Adam Levine, and Mike Elizondo for Bedingfield's second album, N.B. (2007) and features Levine for background vocals. It was released as promotional single on 7 October 2007 in the United Kingdom. The song was released as a digital download only and failed to chart in the United Kingdom.

== Music video ==
The music video was filmed in Mexico in late August 2007. The video features Bedingfield filming her own music video to the song with her boyfriend. It premiered on the "members area" section of Bedingfield's official website on 14 September 2007.

== Charts ==
Weekly chart performance for "Say It Again"
Chart (2008)	Peak position
Romania (Romanian Top 100)	89

== Formats and track listings ==
Digital download
(Released 7 October 2007)

1. "Say It Again" – 3:31

== Personnel ==
The following people contributed to "Say It Again":

- Natasha Bedingfield – lead vocals
- Adam Levine – backing vocals
- Mike Elizondo – guitar, bass guitar, programming, keyboards
- Trevor Lawrence – drums, cymbals
- Adam Hawkins – engineering
- David Kutch – mastering

== Release history ==
Country	Date	Format	Label
United Kingdom	7 October 2007	Digital download	Phonogenic
