= Pocketful of Sunshine =

2008 single by Natasha Bedingfield

Single by Natasha Bedingfield

from the album Pocketful of Sunshine and Strip Me Away
- Released: 15 January 2008
- Studio: Henson (Los Angeles); Larrabee (Los Angeles); Starstruck (Nashville)
- Genre: Pop
- Length: 3:23
- Label: Epic
- Songwriters: Natasha Bedingfield; Danielle Brisebois; John Shanks
- Producer: John Shanks

Natasha Bedingfield singles chronology
"Love Like This" (2007)	"Pocketful of Sunshine" (2008)	"Bruised Water" (2008)

Music video
- "Pocketful of Sunshine" on YouTube

"Pocketful of Sunshine" is a song recorded by English singer Natasha Bedingfield for Pocketful of Sunshine (2008), the reissue of her second studio album. (Note: Bedingfield's second studio album N.B. was released in April 2007, outside the US. In January 2008, the album was released in North America as Pocketful of Sunshine, with an altered track listing, including "Pocketful of Sunshine" as one of the new tracks.) Bedingfield co-wrote the song together with American songwriter Danielle Brisebois and American musician and songwriter John Shanks; Shanks also produced the track as well as performing on most of the instruments present. Epic Records serviced the song to the US contemporary hit radio as the second single from Pocketful of Sunshine on 15 January 2008.

Bedingfield noted "Pocketful of Sunshine" as her favourite, stating that it centers on escaping from one's troubles. It adapts dance-pop and adult contemporary styles, differing from her previous recordings. Lyrically, the song discusses escapism and finding a peaceful place in difficult situations. The message is amplified by the melancholic tone of the lyrics mixing with the exuberance displayed in Bedingfield's voice. "Pocketful of Sunshine" was well received by contemporary music critics; the majority of them named it as one of the album's highlights. Several critics also praised it as a bright and lively summer tune.

"Pocketful of Sunshine" was not commercially released in Bedingfield's native United Kingdom, but experienced commercial success in North America. In the US, it peaked at number five on the Billboard Hot 100 and was certified double platinum by the Recording Industry Association of America (RIAA), selling three million downloads and becoming her most successful single there. In Canada, it peaked at number three on Canadian Hot 100 and was certified platinum by Music Canada. The song was not released in Europe until April 2011, when it was released as the lead single from her third European studio album Strip Me Away (2011), to moderate success.

The music video for "Pocketful of Sunshine" premiered on 15 April 2008, and features Bedingfield escaping from a stressful situation and dancing on a roof with other background dancers, also portraying scenes of other people escaping their troubles, coming to Bedingfield for comfort. The single has been used widely in the media, being featured in movies and television series such as Easy A, The Ugly Truth, and Degrassi: The Next Generation.

== Background ==
"Pocketful of Sunshine" was written and produced by John Shanks, while additional writing was provided by Bedingfield and Danielle Brisebois. The aforementioned songwriters were also involved in performing the background vocals present on the track. Shanks, a musician as well as a writer and producer, performed several instruments that make up the song, which include the guitar, bass and keyboards. The latter instrument was also played by Charlie Judge while Wendy Melvain performed on guitar. Jeff Rothschild was the engineer behind the recording process of "Pocketful of Sunshine", which took place at Starstruck Studios in Nashville, Tennessee and Henson Recording Studios in Hollywood, California. He received assistance from engineers Aaron Kasdorf and Jared Robbins in recording the song. Rothschild was involved in programming the song as well as playing the drums. It was then edited through the use of Pro Tools technology by Lars Fox and mixed by Manny Marroquin at Larrabee Studios in Los Angeles, California. In an interview with OK! Magazine, Bedingfield the song as one of her favourites on the album, stating "Its about going to a familiar place when you're in that situation that you want to escape from finding a peaceful place within."

"Pocketful of Sunshine" was released as the second single from Pocketful of Sunshine (2008), the North American edition of Bedingfield's second studio album N.B. (2007). Epic Records serviced the song to the US contemporary hit radio on 11 February 2008. On 29 July, an extended play of remixes for "Pocketful of Sunshine" was released via iTunes Store. Preceding Strip Me Away—the European release of Bedingfield's third studio album Strip Me (2010)—"Pocketful of Sunshine" was released in Europe for the first time in April 2011.

== Composition ==
"Pocketful of Sunshine"
A 19-second sample of "Pocketful of Sunshine"'s chorus.

"Pocketful of Sunshine" is a pop song that incorporates styles of dance-pop and runs for three minutes and twenty three seconds. The song is built on an electro beat. According to the digital music sheet published at Musicnotes.com by EMI Music Publishing, it is written in the key of A minor. The song is set in common time and to a moderate groove with a tempo of 110 beats per minute. Bedingfield's vocals range from A_{3} to D_{5}. The song follows a chord progression of Am-Gsus2-F-Dm in some parts and Am-C-G-F in other parts. Lyrically, "Pocketful of Sunshine" is about finding refuge and escape in love and the small triumphs of life. The message is amplified by the contrast between the melancholic tone of the lyrics and the exuberance of Bedingfield's vocals.

== Critical reception ==
"Pocketful of Sunshine" received generally positive reviews from music critics. Matthew Chisling of AllMusic named it one of the album's highlights, commenting that it was "geared perfectly toward the mainstream American market." About.com writer Bill Lamb, in his review of the derivative album, also named it one of the album's top tracks and in his review of the single itself, praised Bedingfield's style of singing and the contrast between the melancholy tone and the lyrics aimed towards love and escape. Mike Schiller, a writer for PopMatters, praised it as being "so utterly effervescent that it could re-carbonate a seven-days-open can of soda." Julie Farmer of Blogcritics praised it as one of the album's standout tracks. Sal Cinquemani of Slant Magazine labelled it as one of the strongest tracks on the album, writing that it is evocative of Canadian singer Nelly Furtado's third studio album Loose (2006). Digital Spy writer Alex Fletcher praised the recording for its sound but criticised its lack of originality, writing that "it sounds as American as 'The Star-Spangled Banner' being belted out by a redneck Texan." Andrew Greenhalgh of Patrol Magazine wrote it as a summertime favourite, commenting "It’s one of those songs that cries out for a convertible with the top down and a long drive to the beach."

== Commercial performance ==
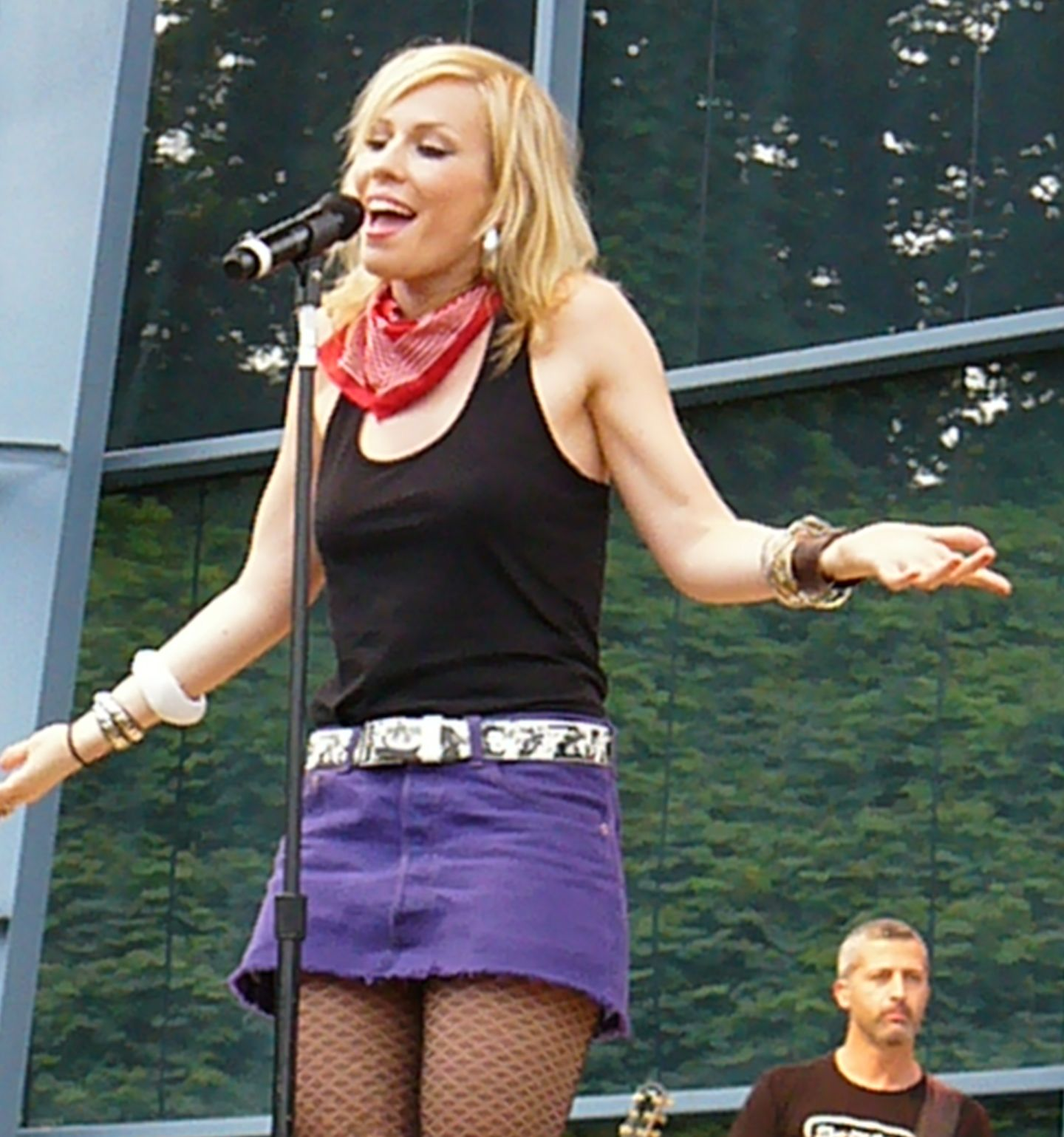
"Pocketful of Sunshine" earned Bedingfield her second top five single in North America. It became her highest-charting single in Canada and tied with "Unwritten" as her highest charting effort in the United States.

"Pocketful of Sunshine" experienced its highest success in North America. In the United States, the song debuted on the Billboard Hot 100 at number 65 on the week ending 9 February 2008 whilst debuting on the Digital Songs at number 24. It dropped to number 88 in its second week, and dropped out the week after before re-entering the chart at number 94 four weeks later, on the week ending 15 March 2008. It continued to ascend the chart, entering the top ten at number eight in its twelfth week, until the week ending 5 July 2008, when "Pocketful of Sunshine" reached its peak position at number five. It spent 11 non-consecutive weeks in the top ten, and was present on the chart for a total of 35 weeks. It was successful on the radio component charts, peaking at number three on the Adult Contemporary and the Adult Top 40 charts, at number four on the Mainstream Top 40 chart, and at number ten on the Radio Songs chart. The single also became her second single to top the Dance Club Songs. "Pocketful of Sunshine" has become Bedingfield's most successful single in the United States, selling over three million downloads and being certified double platinum by the Recording Industry Association of America (RIAA) almost a year after its release. The song fared similarly in Canada, where it debuted on the Canadian Hot 100 at number forty-three, fell to ninety-three the following week and exited the chart the week after. It reappeared on the Canadian Hot 100 a month later and ultimately peaked at number three on the week ending 17 May 2008. The single spent a total of thirty-eight weeks on the chart, selling over 40,000 downloads, and earning a platinum certification by Music Canada on 19 November 2008.

Following the release of Strip Me Away (2011) in Europe, "Pocketful of Sunshine", included in the album's track listing, was selected to be the international single. More than a month after its release, the song began charting in Germany, debuting at number thirty-four. It steadily ascended the chart, reaching its peak position at number twenty-four over a month later. The single also charted in Austria within the same time period, debuting at number sixty-eight and peaking at number twenty-eight, where it remained for two consecutive weeks. The song experienced less commercial success in Switzerland as it charted within the lower positions of the Swiss Singles Chart for most of its run. It eventually peaked at number forty-three and quickly exited the chart weeks later.

== Music video ==
A shot from the video, where Bedingfield "escapes" from her workplace

The music video for "Pocketful of Sunshine" was directed by Alan Ferguson, who has directed music videos for Fall Out Boy, Gym Class Heroes, and Katy Perry. It was released on 15 April 2008 to MTV. The video opens with Bedingfield at a work building; scenes of a child drawing a picture while his parents are fighting and a teenager drawing graffiti in a parking lot are intercut through the video. After she drops off her work, Bedingfield grabs a parachute and jumps out the window. She lands on a rooftop with a change of attire and more people following suit. While Bedingfield sings, the crowd dances. Meanwhile, a teenager is spray painting on a wall until the police arrive to arrest him. The video also cuts into scenes of Bedingfield in a red dress spinning around against the wind. In an attempt to escape, the teenager punches through the wall, entering the rooftop with Bedingfield and the backup dancers.

Bedingfield is then sitting in a chair and when an eclipse occurs, hence the line "in the darkness there's light." As the eclipse begins to pass, Bedingfield red butterflies are released from her hands while she sings the line "there's only butterflies." Bedingfield performs for the crowd of dancers and is seen dancing with teenager shown earlier in the video. Back at the work building, the employees watch Bedingfield's performance via the LG Voyager cell phone. The video at this point features the child still drawing his picture and covering his ears, blocking out the sound of his parents arguing. The child walks out of the house he drew, when the camera shows Bedingfield meditating on a large lotus flower, while a group of belly dancers dance around her. As the child walks up to her, Bedingfield opens her eyes. The end of the video shows the lotus flower rising up, while Bedingfield sings the final lines, then looking at the child. Future Dance Central choreographer Nick Demoura appears in the video.

== Usage in media ==
"Pocketful of Sunshine" was recorded by Bedingfield in Simlish for the video game The Sims 2: FreeTime; a music video was also made using the game and portraying Bedingfield as a Sim. It was featured on the mid-season finale of the MTV reality television series The Hills, whose theme song is Bedingfield's "Unwritten". Bedingfield performed the song on the 7th-season finale of the Canadian television series Degrassi: The Next Generation. The song is also in the soundtrack of the film The Ugly Truth (2009). In the fall of 2008, "Pocketful of Sunshine" was used in the promotional campaign for the syndicated launch of the television series Lost. "Pocketful of Sunshine" was also used in the background of several of ABC's "Start Fresh" commercials such as those for Desperate Housewives and Grey's Anatomy. The song is also featured on Audition Online.

In the United States, the escape-themed song's chorus portion was used in a 2008 television commercial to promote Pechanga Resort and Casino in California. This makes "Pocketful of Sunshine" Bedingfield's second single to be used in a television ad campaign. The chorus was also heard in promotional spots for the television series In Plain Sight, which airs on the USA Network. It was included in the soundtrack album Music from Degrassi: The Next Generation (2008). The song and music video were featured in the video game Dance Dance Revolution Hottest Party 3. It was also featured in the end credits of the film Igor (2008). "Pocketful of Sunshine" was featured prominently in the film Easy A (2010): after receiving a greeting card from her grandmother that plays the song, the main character Olive Penderghast (portrayed by Emma Stone), declares it to be "the worst song ever" before becoming addicted to it, going so far as to use it as her ringtone. In 2024, "Pocketful of Sunshine" was used as a searched song in Google's television commercials to promote their app in phones.

== Track listing ==
US digital single

1. "Pocketful of Sunshine" (radio edit) – 3:02

Promotional CD

1. "Pocketful of Sunshine" (radio edit) – 3:02
2. "Pocketful of Sunshine" (album version) – 3:22
3. "Love like This" (Jim Jonsin Remix) – 4:14

Club promo mixes CD

1. "Pocketful of Sunshine" (Johnny Vicious Club)
2. "Pocketful of Sunshine" (StoneBridge Club)
3. "Pocketful of Sunshine" (Johnny Vicious Radio)
4. "Pocketful of Sunshine" (StoneBridge Radio)
5. "Pocketful of Sunshine" (Johnny Vicious Warehouse Mix)
6. "Pocketful of Sunshine" (Johnny Vicious Dub)
7. "Pocketful of Sunshine" (StoneBridge Dub)
8. "Pocketful of Sunshine" (radio edit)

German CD single

1. "Pocketful of Sunshine" (album version) – 3:22
2. "Pocketful of Sunshine" (Johnny Vicious Club Remix) - 10:12

== Credits and personnel ==
Credits adapted from the liner notes of Pocketful of Sunshine.

Recording and mixing

- Recorded at Starstruck Studios in Nashville, Tennessee and Henson Recording Studios in Hollywood, California
- Mixed at Larrabee Studios in Los Angeles, California

Personnel

- Vocals, background vocals – Natasha Bedingfield
- Songwriting – Natasha Bedingfield, Danielle Brisebois, John Shanks, Jamal Byrd
- Production and bass – John Shanks
- Keyboards – John Shanks, Charlie Judge
- Guitars – John Shanks, Wendy Melvoin
- Drums and programming – Jeff Rothschild
- Recording – Jeff Rothschild, Aaron Kasdorf (assistant), Jared Robbins (assistant)
- Mixing – Manny Marroquin
- Pro Tools – Lars Fox

== Charts ==
=== Weekly charts ===
Weekly chart performance for "Pocketful of Sunshine"
Chart (2008–2011)	Peak position
Austria (Ö3 Austria Top 40)	28
Belgium (Ultratip Bubbling Under Flanders)	20
Canada Hot 100 (Billboard)	3
Canada AC (Billboard)	3
Canada CHR/Top 40 (Billboard)	11
Canada Hot AC (Billboard)	1
Czech Republic Airplay (ČNS IFPI)	41
Germany (GfK)	24
Iceland (Tónlistinn)	9
Netherlands (Dutch Top 40 Tipparade)	7
Netherlands (Single Top 100)	88
Switzerland (Schweizer Hitparade)	43
US Billboard Hot 100	5
US Adult Contemporary (Billboard)	3
US Adult Pop Airplay (Billboard)	3
US Dance Club Songs (Billboard)	1
US Dance Airplay (Billboard)	1
US Pop 100 (Billboard)	5
US Pop Airplay (Billboard)	4

2026 weekly chart performance for "Pocketful of Sunshine"
Chart (2026)	Peak position
Sweden Heatseeker (Sverigetopplistan)	15

=== Year-end charts ===
2008 year-end chart performance for "Pocketful of Sunshine"
Chart (2008)	Position
Canada (Canadian Hot 100)	12
Canada AC (Billboard)	19
Canada Hot AC (Billboard)	4
US Billboard Hot 100	18
US Adult Contemporary (Billboard)	14
US Adult Top 40 (Billboard)	13
US Dance Club Play (Billboard)	38
US Hot Dance Airplay (Billboard)	13
US Mainstream Top 40 (Billboard)	17

2009 year-end chart performance for "Pocketful of Sunshine"
Chart (2009)	Position
US Adult Contemporary (Billboard)	10

== Certifications ==
Certifications for "Pocketful of Sunshine"
Region	Certification	Certified units/sales
Canada (Music Canada)	Platinum	40,000^{*}
Denmark (IFPI Danmark)	Gold	45,000^{‡}
Germany (BVMI)	Platinum	600,000^{‡}
New Zealand (RMNZ)	2× Platinum	60,000^{‡}
United Kingdom (BPI)	Platinum	600,000^{‡}
United States (RIAA)	2× Platinum	2,000,000^{*}
United States (RIAA) Mastertone	Gold	500,000^{*}
^{*} Sales figures based on certification alone.^{‡} Sales+streaming figures based on certification alone.

== Release history ==
Release dates and formats for "Pocketful of Sunshine"
Region	Date	Format(s)	Label(s)	Ref.
United States	11 February 2008	Contemporary hit radio	Epic	
United States	29 July 2008	Digital download (EP)	Epic	
Germany	15 April 2011	Digital download	Sony Music	
Germany	6 May 2011	CD	Sony Music	
