= Johnny Vicious =

American house DJ, producer and remixer

- Also known as: Liquid Bass, Noisemaker
- Born: John Coles
- Origin: New York City, New York, U.S.
- Genres: House, dance
- Occupations: DJ, remixer, producer
- Years active: 1989–present
- Labels: Vicious Muzik Records; Warehouse Records NYC; Vish Records; Subversive Records; Ultra Records; ThriveDance
- Website: www.johnnyvicious.club

Johnny Vicious (born John Coles) is an American house DJ, producer and remixer. He DJed in New York City clubs Mars and Paladium in the 1980s, and in the early 1990s started his own label, Vicious Muzik Records, with Jeffrey Rodman.

Vicious became widely known for remixing the hits "Kiss You All Over" by No Mercy, "Let's Go All the Way" by React, and "It's Not Right but It's Okay" by Whitney Houston, as well as doing remixes for the compilations Webster Hall Presents: A Groovilicious Night and Ministry of Sound: Club Nation America. He scored one major chart hit, 2005's "Can't Let Go" (featuring Judy Albanese), which hit No. 4 on the US Billboard Dance Chart. His remixes have appeared on the hit Ultra.Dance compilations, as well as on the ThriveMix Presents albums, many of which have hit the US Billboard albums charts.

== Discography ==
=== Albums/mixed compilations ===
- Liquid Bass EP: Volume 1 (Vicious Muzik Records, 1993)
- Grind: All Night House Music Party (Continuum Records, 1994)
- The Beginning (Vicious Muzik Records, 1995)
- New York in the Mix (Subversive Records, 1996)
- Ministry of Sound: Club Nation America (Ultimix Records, 2001) US Heatseekers No. 40, US Independent No. 17
- Ultra.Dance 01 (Ultra Records, 2002) US Heatseekers No. 14, US Electronic No. 3, US Independent No. 12
- Ultra.Dance 03 (Ultra Records, 2003) US Heatseekers No. 6, US Electronic No. 1, US Independent No. 4
- Ultra.Trance:3 (Ultra Records, 2004) US Heatseekers No. 9, US Electronic No. 4, US Independent No. 10
- Deeper & Harder, Vol. 1 (Dee Vee Music, 2004) US Electronic No. 22
- Ministry of Sound: Clubber's Guide, Vol. 1 (Ultimix Records, 2005) US Electronic No. 8
- ThriveMix Presents: Trance Anthems, Vol. 1 (ThriveDance, 2006) US Electronic No. 10, US Independent No. 44
- ThriveMix Presents: Electro, Vol. 1 (ThriveDance, 2007) US Heatseekers No. 46, US Electronic No. 10
- ThriveMix Presents: Dance Anthems, Vol. 1 (ThriveDance, 2007) US Heatseekers No. 8, US Electronic No. 2, US Independent No. 27
- ThriveMix Presents: Trance Anthems, Vol. 2 (ThriveDance, 2007) US Heatseekers No. 30, US Electronic No. 6
- ThriveMix Presents: Dance Classics, Vol. 1 (ThriveDance, 2007) US Electronic No. 15
- Total Music: Dance Classics, Vol. 1 (ThriveDance, 2010) US Electronic No. 16

=== Singles/EPs ===
- "Can't Let Go" (feat. Judy Albanese) (Nervous Records, 2006)

=== Remixography ===
- Angel Clivillés - "Show Me"
- Ashley Tisdale - "It's Alright, It's Ok"
- Ayumi Hamasaki - "Crossroad"
- Ayumi Hamasaki - "M"
- Ayumi Hamasaki - "Mirrorcle World"
- BoA - "Eat You Up"
- BoA - "I Did It for Love"
- Beyoncé - "Ego"
- Brainbug - "Rain"
- Britney Spears - "Gimme More" (No. 1 on Billboard's Hot Dance Club Play Chart)
- Britney Spears - "Piece Of Me" (No. 1 on Billboard's Hot Dance Club Play Chart)
- Byron Stingily - "That's the Way Love Is"
- Cher - "You Haven't Seen the Last of Me"
- Chicane - "Don't Give Up"
- Dido - "Here with Me"
- Duncan Sheik - "Reasons for Living"
- Erika Jayne - "Give You Everything"
- Evanescence - "Call Me When You're Sober"
- Gigi D' Agostino - "L'Amour Toujours (I'll Fly With You)"
- Jason Derülo - "Whatcha Say"
- Jerry Calliste, Jr. - "Al-Naafiysh (The Soul)"
- Jessi Malay - "On You"
- Jennifer Hudson - "Spotlight"
- Julien-K - "Kick the Bass"
- Kat DeLuna featuring Elephant Man - "Whine Up" (No. 1 on Billboard's Hot Dance Club Play Chart)
- Kat DeLuna - "Run the Show"
- Loleatta Holloway - "The Queen's Anthem"
- Madonna - "Celebration"
- Madonna - "Miles Away"
- Mai Kuraki - "Yes or No"
- Mayra Veronica- "If You Wanna Fly" (No. 5 on Billboard's Dance/Electronic Overall Single Sales Chart)
- Michael Jackson featuring Akon - "Wanna Be Startin' Somethin' 2008"
- Mariah Carey - "Auld Lang Syne (The New Year's Anthem)"
- M2M - "Don't Say You Love Me"
- Natasha Bedingfield featuring Sean Kingston - "Love Like This" (No. 1 on Billboard's Hot Dance Club Play Chart)
- Natasha Bedingfield - "Pocketful of Sunshine" (No. 1 on Billboard's Hot Dance Club Play Chart)
- Natasha Bedingfield - "Unwritten" (No. 1 on Billboard's Hot Dance Club Play Chart)
- Ono - "Give Peace a Chance"
- Sa-Fire - "Exotique"
- Shakira - "Illegal" (No. 1 on Billboard's Hot Dance Club Play Chart)
- Shontelle - "Impossible"
- Snake River Conspiracy - "Vulcan"
- The Ting Tings - "Shut Up and Let Me Go"
- The White Tie Affair - "Candle (Sick & Tired)"
- Hikaru Utada - "Automatic"
- Veronica - "Release Me (Let Me Go)"
- Veronica - "Someone to Hold"
- Whitney Houston - "I Look to You"
- Whitney Houston - "It's Not Right but It's Okay"
