= Love Like This (Natasha Bedingfield song) =

2007 single by Natasha Bedingfield

Single by Natasha Bedingfield featuring Sean Kingston

from the album Pocketful of Sunshine
- B-side: "Stepping Stone"
- Released: 2 October 2007
- Genre: Pop; reggae; R&B
- Length: 3:42
- Label: Phonogenic; Epic
- Songwriters: Natasha Bedingfield; Ryan Tedder; Louis Biancaniello; Rico Love; Sam Watters; Wayne Wilkins; Kisean Anderson
- Producer: The Runawayz

Natasha Bedingfield singles chronology
"Soulmate" (2007)	"Love Like This" (2007)	"Pocketful of Sunshine" (2008)

Sean Kingston singles chronology
"Me Love" (2007)	"Love Like This" (2007)	"Big Girls Don't Cry (remix)" (2007)

Music video
- "Love Like This" on YouTube

"Love Like This" is a song performed by British singer Natasha Bedingfield. It was included as the lead single of Bedingfield's second North American album, Pocketful of Sunshine, and features vocals from Jamaican-American reggae singer Sean Kingston. The song was written by Bedingfield, Kingston, Louis Biancaniello, Rico Love, Ryan Tedder, Sam Watters, and Wayne Wilkins, while production was handled by Biancaniello, Love, Tedder, and Watters under their production group, the Runawayz. Its lyrics discuss finding love with a person who has "been there all your life and has always loved you, but you've never noticed it until now". The official remix features vocals from rapper Lil Wayne and a slightly different beat, produced by Jim Jonsin.

The song was released in North America on 2 October 2007 to mixed reviews from critics. It was released in the United Kingdom and Ireland on 7 April 2008. The song was a commercial success, reaching the top 20 on the majority of the charts it entered, and topped the Billboard Hot Dance Club Play chart in the United States. On 12 March 2008, "Love Like This" was certified platinum by the Recording Industry Association of America.

== Background ==
In 2007, Bedingfield began writing and recording new material for her second North American album Pocketful of Sunshine. Producer J. R. Rotem had been working with Bedingfield on the album. Rotem introduced Bedingfield to reggae pop singer/rapper Sean Kingston, who was also recording with Rotem. Bedingfield decided to work with Kingston because she "just Liked his thing". In an interview with Digital Spy, she said that she respected rappers and seemed to "have a little thing with rappers" since she had previously worked with Estelle, Eve and Bizarre from D12.

== Composition ==
The song was written by Bedingfield, Kingston, Wayne Wilkins, Louis Biancaniello, Rico Love, Ryan Tedder from the band OneRepublic, and Sam Watters—an original member of American R&B group Color Me Badd. It was also produced by Biancaniello, Love, Tedder, and Watters together as the Runawayz. The song is composed in the key of F major and set in common time. Bedingfield's vocals span from C_{4} to F_{5}. The Auto Tune effect is heard in a few parts of the song. In the song, Bedingfield discusses finding love with a person who has always "been there all your life", but that "you've never noticed it until now". According to her, it is all about realizing how that person is actually the "love of your life".

== Critical reception ==
"Love Like This" received mixed reviews from critics. Chuck Taylor in a review for Billboard described the song as a "jaunty, youthful track that clears home base and should propel Nat forward", while Chris Boeckmann of Stylus Magazine called it "useless" and a "dud". Michael Slezak of Entertainment Weekly found the song left him "feeling absolutely nothing". Slezak was unimpressed with the pairing of Bedingfield and Kingston, writing "it's as if two people who I'm not entirely convinced can sing got together and recorded a heavily focus-grouped song, then ran their vocals through a giant computer".

In a review for About.com, Bill Lamb called the song "irrepressibly sunny, but forgettable". In another review of the song, Lamb wrote that Kingston's vocals "serve no purpose other than providing an extra element for the single's marketing campaign".

== Chart performance ==
"Love Like This" debuted at number 19 on the Billboard Bubbling Under Hot 100 Singles chart. The following week the song rose to number four, before debuting on the Hot 100 chart at number 94. Fifteen weeks later "Love Like This" reached number 11. The song did well on pop-oriented charts, reaching number 10 on the Pop 100 chart and number 10 on the Top 40 Mainstream chart. The single had crossover success in the dance charts, where it reached number one on the Hot Dance Club Play chart and number 17 on the Hot Dance Airplay chart. The song has sold over one million digital downloads and has been certified platinum by the Recording Industry Association of America.

Elsewhere, "Love Like This" was largely successful, reaching number nine in Canada and number five in New Zealand. In the United Kingdom, the song debuted at number 27 on 25 March 2008. Four weeks later, it reached number 20 and remained on the singles chart for seven weeks.

== Music video ==
The music video was directed by Gil Green and produced by Merge @ Crossroads. Filmed in Los Angeles, California, the video features Bedingfield reuniting with a love from her past. The video begins with Bedingfield singing in a park. She then meets up with a boyfriend (played by model Josh Slack) from her past. The two then remember the good times they had together while sitting on a picnic bench. The video concludes with Bedingfield singing and dancing at a house party. Scenes of Kingston in front of an ice cream truck and at the house party are intercut throughout the video.

The video premiered on Bedingfield's official US website on 27 October 2007. In 2008, the video reached number two on VH1's VSpot Top 20 Countdown in the United States.

== Formats and track listings ==
These are the formats and track listings of major single releases of "Love Like This".

US vinyl single
(88697227731-S1; Released 2007)

1. "Love Like This" (Johnny Vicious Club Vox) – 9:47
2. "Love Like This" (Johnny Vicious Radio Mix) – 3:53
3. "Love Like This" (Kings of Tomorrow Club Mix) – 6:31
4. "Love Like This" (Johnny Vicious Warehouse Mix) – 5:42

Digital download single
(Released 3 October 2007)

1. "Love Like This" – 3:45

Digital EP
(Released 15 January 2008)

1. "Love Like This" (Johnny Vicious Club Vox) – 9:43
2. "Love Like This" (Johnny Vicious Radio Mix) – 3:53
3. "Love Like This" (Kings of Tomorrow Club Mix) – 6:31
4. "Love Like This" (Johnny Vicious Warehouse Mix) – 5:44

German CD single
(886972-996028; Released 4 April 2008)

1. "Love Like This" – 3:45
2. "Love Like This" (Natasha only) – 3:43

German Maxi-CD single
(886972-959429; Released 4 April 2008)

1. "Love Like This" – 3:45
2. "Love Like This" (Natasha only) – 3:43
3. "Love Like This" (Johnny Vicious Radio Remix) – 3:53
4. "Love Like This" (Video)

UK CD single
(88697287252; Released 7 April 2008)

1. "Love Like This"
2. "Stepping Stone"

== Personnel ==
- Natasha Bedingfield – lead vocals
- Sean Kingston – vocals
- Ravaughn Brown – backing vocals
- Keith Gretlein, Nate Hertweck, Matt Serrecchio – assistant engineer
- Greg Ogan – vocal engineering
- The Runawayz – production, mixing, instruments
- David Kutch – mastering
- Ryan Tedder – songwriting, producer, additional instruments

== Charts ==
=== Weekly charts ===
Weekly chart performance for "Love Like This"
Chart (2007–2008)	Peak position
Australia (ARIA)	77
Canada Hot 100 (Billboard)	9
Canada AC (Billboard)	47
Canada CHR/Top 40 (Billboard)	17
Canada Hot AC (Billboard)	9
Germany (GfK)	33
Ireland (IRMA)	34
New Zealand (Recorded Music NZ)	5
Romania (Romanian Top 100)	91
Scotland Singles (OCC)	14
UK Singles (OCC)	20
US Billboard Hot 100	11
US Adult Pop Airplay (Billboard)	21
US Dance Club Songs (Billboard)	1
US Dance/Mix Show Airplay (Billboard)	17
US Pop Airplay (Billboard)	10
US Pop 100 (Billboard)	10
US Rhythmic Airplay (Billboard)	35

=== Year-end charts ===
Year-end chart performance for "Love Like This"
Chart (2008)	Position
Canada (Canadian Hot 100)	66
US Billboard Hot 100	72
US Dance Club Play (Billboard)	44

== Certifications ==
Certifications for "Love Like This"
Region	Certification	Certified units/sales
New Zealand (RMNZ)	Platinum	30,000^{‡}
United States (RIAA)	Platinum	1,000,000^{*}
^{*} Sales figures based on certification alone.^{‡} Sales+streaming figures based on certification alone.

== Release history ==
Release dates and formats for "Love Like This"
Region	Date	Format(s)	Label(s)	Ref.
United States	2 October 2007	Contemporary hit radio	Epic	
United Kingdom	17 March 2008	Digital download	Phonogenic	
Germany	4 April 2008	CD; maxi CD	Sony BMG	
United Kingdom	7 April 2008	CD	Phonogenic	
