= I Wanna Have Your Babies =

2007 single by Natasha Bedingfield

Single by Natasha Bedingfield

from the album N.B.
- B-side: "What If's"
- Released: 12 March 2007
- Recorded: 2006
- Genre: Pop; hip hop; R&B
- Length: 3:37
- Label: Phonogenic
- Songwriters: Natasha Bedingfield; Steve Kipner; Andrew Frampton; Wayne Wilkins
- Producers: Natasha Bedingfield; Steve Kipner; Andrew Frampton; Wayne Wilkins

Natasha Bedingfield singles chronology
| "I Bruise Easily" (2005) | "I Wanna Have Your Babies" (2007) | "Soulmate" (2007) |

"I Wanna Have Your Babies" is a song by British recording artist Natasha Bedingfield. It was written by Steve Kipner, Andrew Frampton, Wayne Wilkins and Bedingfield for her second album, N.B. (2007). The song's musical-style and production was inspired by hip hop music, and its lyrics discuss a woman's battle to stop herself from rushing into relationships in an effort to find the right man to be the father of her children.

The song was released as the album's first single in the second quarter of 2007. The track received mixed reviews from pop music critics, who generally found it to be less impressive than past singles. It entered the top forty in Germany, Ireland and The Netherlands, and became Bedingfield's fourth United Kingdom top ten single release.

== Background and writing ==
In 2006, Bedingfield began writing and recording material with previous collaborators Steve Kipner, Andrew Frampton and Wayne Wilkins in Los Angeles, California. During one of their sessions, they penned "I Wanna Have Your Babies", which was inspired by a year-and-a-half of touring across the United States. Bedingfield had never been away from her family and friends for an extended period of time and "realised how important relationships are". She wanted to write songs that matched who she was, commenting that her "first album was about independence and opportunism. I’m in a different place now. I've been dating, searching for a partner, looking for Mr Right."

In the song, Bedingfield discusses a woman's fight to stop herself from rushing into relationships in an effort to find the right man to father her children. Bedingfield stated that she does not want to have children at this point in time, but that she is thinking about it. According to her, "the song is about pacing yourself and taking everything slowly."

== Critical reception ==
"I Wanna Have Your Babies" received mixed reviews from music critics. Channel 4 described it as a "well thought out pop record", while Paul Taylor of the Manchester Evening News was appreciative of the song's "sing-song melody" and "ragged hip-hop beats". Tony Cummings named the song's "R&B pop confection" as "catchy". However, online magazine Drowned in Sound ridiculed the track, writing that it is "polluting the [radio] airwaves with its beyond-banal lyrics." The single's music video was described in the review as "unforgivable". The BBC was unimpressed with the song as well, claiming it had plagiarised the melody of "I Want You Back" by pop group The Jackson 5.

== Chart performance ==
"I Wanna Have Your Babies" was officially solicited to radio in the United Kingdom on 12 March 2007. The song was released as a download on 2 April 2007, two weeks before its physical release. It debuted on the UK Singles Chart at number 25 on 8 April 2007, on download sales only. A week after its physical release the song reached the top 10, rising from number 15 to number seven. In Ireland the song debuted at number 36 on the singles chart and peaked at number eight. "I Wanna Have Your Babies" proved popular on Irish radio, charting at number 14. The single had moderate success in Europe. After three weeks on the European Hot 100 Singles chart, the track peaked at number 23. The single reached the top 50 in Italy, the Netherlands and Sweden. In Australia, the song debuted on the singles chart at number 50 on 21 May 2007. The track was more successful on the Physical Singles chart, debuting at number 37.

== Music video ==
Bedingfield working out in a gym during the first scene of the music video.

The music video was directed by Dave Meyers and filmed in Los Angeles, California in January 2007. The video opens with a scene of Bedingfield working out in a gym with a male instructor. Bedingfield and the instructor are then shown running through a park, when a baby stroller suddenly appears. Frightened, the instructor runs away from Bedingfield and the baby. She is next shown playing tennis and flirting with another man. The two are then shown riding on a boat with a toddler, in a race with another couple. The third scene features Bedingfield at a nightclub flirting with yet another man, before they are shown together at his home. In the final scene, she meets a man working at a coffee shop. They are shown in a play room with multiple babies. The video ends with Bedingfield hugging the coffee shop worker, who appears to be undeterred by her thoughts about having babies.

Nadine Coyle, member of the pop group Girls Aloud, makes a cameo appearance in the nightclub scene. The complete version of "I Wanna Have Your Babies" featured in the music video has been released commercially through CD singles and digital downloads, and some include remixes by Snowflakers. The video debuted on Bedingfield's official Bebo website on 6 March 2007. On 21 May 2007, the video debuted in North America on Bedingfield's official U.S. website under the title "Babies". The music video for "I Wanna Have Your Babies" was mocked in an article written by Anna Pickard and published in The Guardian. Pickard made fun of Bedingfield's "clean-cut, straight-toothed, good Christian girl" image, writing that the video was an effort by Bedingfield and her management to be provocative to sell more records.

== Formats and track listings ==
UK CD single

1. "I Wanna Have Your Babies"
2. "Unwritten" (live at the Nokia Theater, New York)

Australian CD single

1. "I Wanna Have Your Babies"
2. "What If's"
3. "Unwritten" (Live at The Nokia Theatre, New York)
4. "I Wanna Have Your Babies" (Snowflakers remix)
5. "I Wanna Have Your Babies" (video)

German CD single

1. "I Wanna Have Your Babies"
2. "Unwritten" (live at the Nokia Theater, New York)

Digital single (released 12 March 2007)

1. "I Wanna Have Your Babies" (radio promo mix) – 3:38

Official remixes

1. "I Wanna Have Your Babies" (Kardinal Beats Mix)
2. "I Wanna Have Your Babies" (Soul Avengerz Mix)

== Charts ==
Weekly chart performance for "I Wanna Have Your Babies"
| Chart (2007) | Peak position |
|---|---|
| Australia (ARIA) | 50 |
| Austria (Ö3 Austria Top 40) | 50 |
| Belgium (Ultratip Bubbling Under Flanders) | 4 |
| Belgium (Ultratip Bubbling Under Wallonia) | 12 |
| Germany (GfK) | 39 |
| Hungary (Rádiós Top 40) | 29 |
| Ireland (IRMA) | 8 |
| Netherlands (Dutch Top 40) | 23 |
| Netherlands (Single Top 100) | 29 |
| Scotland Singles (OCC) | 9 |
| Slovakia Airplay (ČNS IFPI) | 26 |
| Sweden (Sverigetopplistan) | 48 |
| Switzerland (Schweizer Hitparade) | 100 |
| UK Singles (OCC) | 7 |
