= Natasha Bedingfield =

British singer (born 1981)

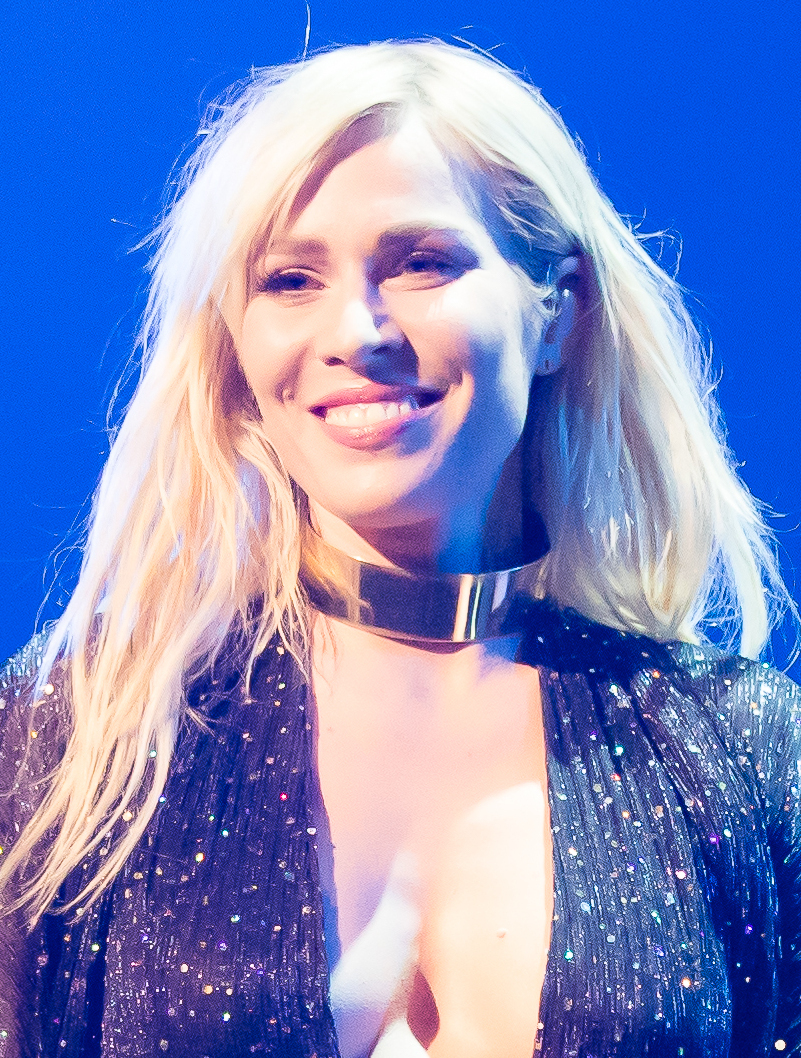
- Bedingfield in 2016
- Born: Natasha Anne Bedingfield; 26 November 1981 (age 44); London, England
- Occupations: Singer; songwriter; record producer
- Years active: 2001–present
- Spouse: Matt Robinson (m. 2009)
- Children: 1
- Relatives: Daniel Bedingfield (brother); Nikola Bedingfield (sister)
- Musical career
- Genres: R&B; pop; dance-pop; blue-eyed soul
- Instrument: Vocals
- Labels: Phonogenic; Epic; We Are Hear
- Website: www.natashabedingfield.com

Natasha Anne Bedingfield (born 26 November 1981) is a British singer and songwriter. She released her debut album, Unwritten, in 2004, which contained primarily up-tempo pop songs and was influenced by R&B music. It enjoyed international success with more than 2.3 million copies sold worldwide. Bedingfield received a Grammy Award nomination for Best Female Pop Vocal Performance for the title track "Unwritten", and at the 2005 and 2006 Brit Awards, she was nominated for Best British Female Artist. Unwritten also produced her only UK number one, "These Words".

Her second studio album, N.B. (2007), yielded the UK top 10 singles "I Wanna Have Your Babies" and "Soulmate". In North America, a heavily reworked reissue of the album was released in 2008 under the name Pocketful of Sunshine, which spawned the singles "Love Like This" and "Pocketful of Sunshine", the latter of which peaked at number 5 on the US Billboard Hot 100 and became her best-selling single in the United States. In December 2010, Bedingfield released her third studio album in North America, Strip Me. Bedingfield has sold over 10 million albums and 10 million singles worldwide, totalling over 20 million records worldwide. In 2012, VH1 ranked Bedingfield number 66 on the list of 100 Greatest Women in Music.

== Early life ==
Natasha Anne Bedingfield was born in London to New Zealand parents and raised in both London and Auckland. When Bedingfield was a teenager, she and her siblings, Daniel and Nikola, formed a dance/electronic group, The DNA Algorithm. The group provided Bedingfield with the opportunity to explore different musical genres and expand her songwriting abilities. She provided vocals for the group which primarily performed dance-pop music about independence and empowerment, themes that would later be found in her own solo compositions. At age 14, Bedingfield sang vocals on Origins Refined Intricacy (Steelyard Records).

Bedingfield attended a year at the University of Greenwich, where she studied psychology, then left to concentrate on singing and songwriting. At first, she recorded demos in the garages of friends who had recording studios, which she presented to record companies. In the early 2000s, Bedingfield composed, wrote and recorded songs for Hillsong Church UK. Her songs appeared on the live albums Blessed, Shout God's Fame and the children's album Jesus Is My Superhero by Hillsong Music Australia.

== Career ==
=== 2003–2006: professional career and Unwritten ===
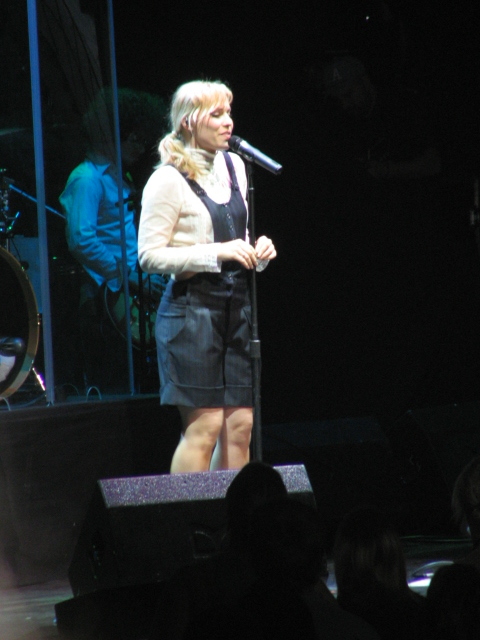
Bedingfield performing in June 2006

Bedingfield was introduced to Phonogenic founder and A&R Paul Lisberg by the artist's manager Gary Wilson. Lisberg was initially hesitant, later telling HitQuarters: "[They] were good but weren't right for us ... " However, it was when, at a meeting together, Lisberg heard her singing ability and creative vocal ad-libbing first-hand that he became excited by Bedingfield's potential. Label interest was later confirmed when a trial studio session together with writers Steve Kipner and Andrew Frampton produced songs that were in keeping with Lisberg's vision for Phonogenic. Bedingfield signed a recording contract with BMG UK & Ireland, through its imprint Phonogenic Records, in July 2003.

Her debut studio album Unwritten was released in September 2004 and featured collaborations with Steve Kipner, Danielle Brisebois, Nick Lachey, James Reilly, Andrew Frampton, Wayne Wilkins, Kara DioGuardi, Guy Chambers, Patrick Leonard and the rapper Bizarre. The album contained uptempo pop-rock songs and influences from R&B music. Bedingfield's lyrics focused on independence, opportunism and female empowerment. Reviews of the album were generally positive, and it was described as a "well-made pop album for the new millennium" by Allmusic. The BBC called it "" a textbook quality pop album". The album debuted on the UK Albums Chart at number one and reached the top thirty in the U.S. It sold well, reaching multi-platinum status in the UK and Gold status in the U.S. The first single released from the album was "Single", which reached number three on the UK Singles Chart. The song's lyrics and accompanying music video depict Bedingfield's single lifestyle. "These Words" was released as the album's second single. The song became Bedingfield's first UK number one and US top twenty single. "Unwritten" was released as the album's third single in 2004: the song reached number six on the UK Singles Chart and it also became the second most played song on US radio in 2006. "I Bruise Easily" was released as the album's fourth single, it did not perform as well as its predecessors but was still a moderate success, reaching number twelve on the UK Singles Chart. The BBC wrote that "you won't be able to get those tunes out of your head".

At the 2005 Brit Awards, Bedingfield was nominated for four awards, though did not win any of her nominated categories. She was also nominated for an award at the 2006 Brit Awards, and in 2007, she was nominated for "Best Female Pop Vocal Performance" at the 2007 Grammy Awards, though was again unsuccessful in winning in any of her nominated categories.

=== 2007–2008: N.B. and Pocketful of Sunshine ===
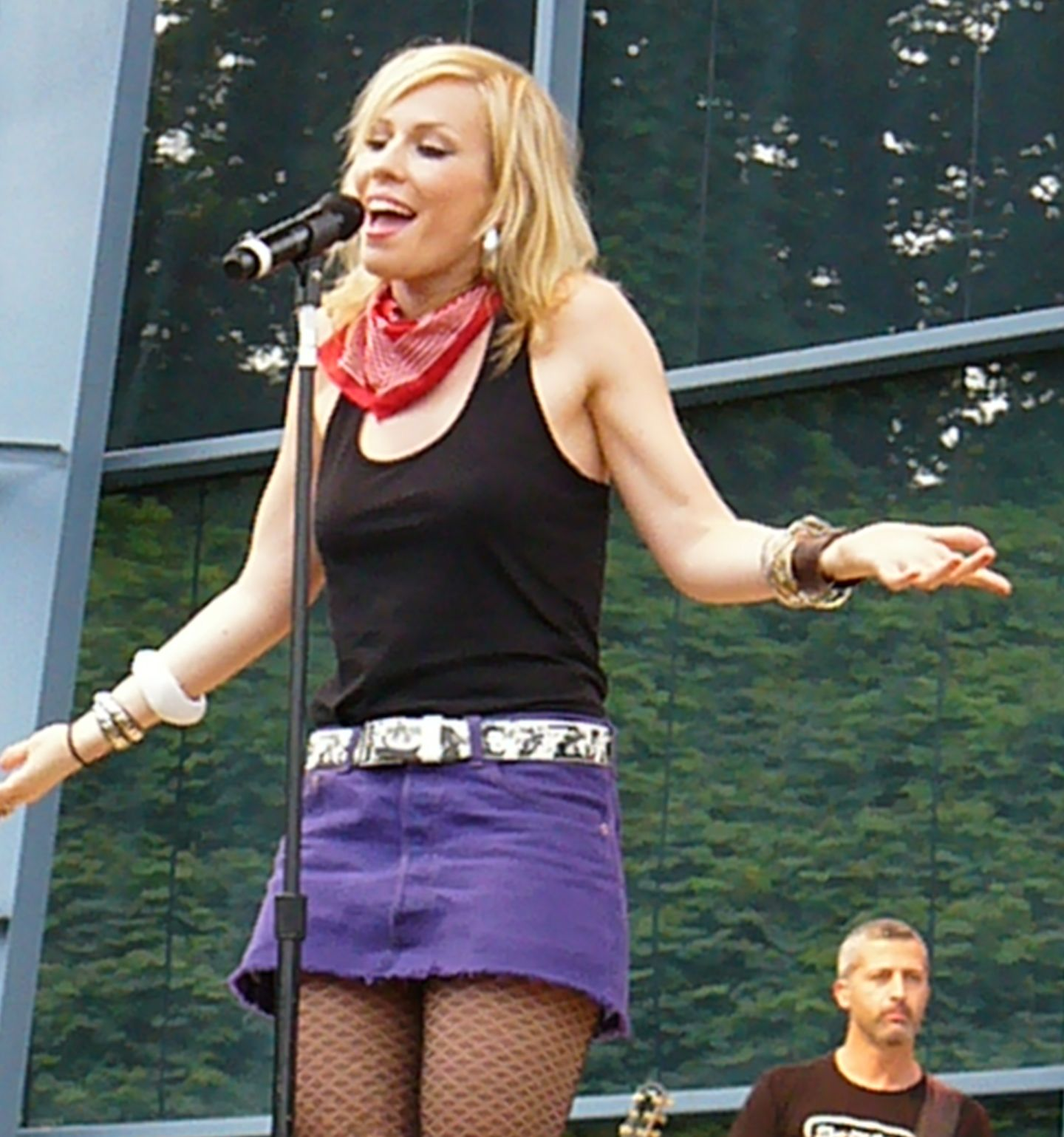
Bedingfield performing at Six Flags Over Georgia in Atlanta in July 2008

Bedingfield's second album, N.B., was released in Europe in April 2007. The album received mixed reviews by critics and peaked at number nine in the UK. "I Wanna Have Your Babies", the album's lead single, was moderately successful, reaching number seven in the UK, number eight in Ireland and the top fifty in various other markets. "Soulmate" was released as the album's second single on 2 July 2007 and also peaked at number seven in the UK. To promote N.B., Bedingfield performed as the opening act for several dates during Justin Timberlake's FutureSex/LoveShow tour beginning in May 2007. She was also scheduled to embark on a solo UK tour to promote the N.B., but it was cancelled twice, with the singer citing promotional commitments in the United States. On 1 July 2007, Bedingfield performed "Unwritten" at the Concert for Diana held at Wembley Stadium, London, an event which celebrated the life of Princess Diana almost ten years after her death.

Following the relative commercial disappointment of N.B., Bedingfield's American label Epic Records chose to postpone the release of a single and the album in the United States. After multiple delays, the album was released in the country on 22 January 2008 as a heavily reworked reissue titled Pocketful of Sunshine, featuring six songs originally from N.B. alongside several new songs. Its lead single, "Love like This", was released in September 2007 and charted at No. 11 on the Billboard Hot 100. The title track was released as the second single in February 2008 and peaked at No. 5 on the Billboard Hot 100. In August 2008, Bedingfield was featured on the single "Just Stand Up!" as part of an all-star female charity supergroup to support "Stand Up to Cancer".

=== 2009–2017: Strip Me, Strip Me Away, and other projects ===
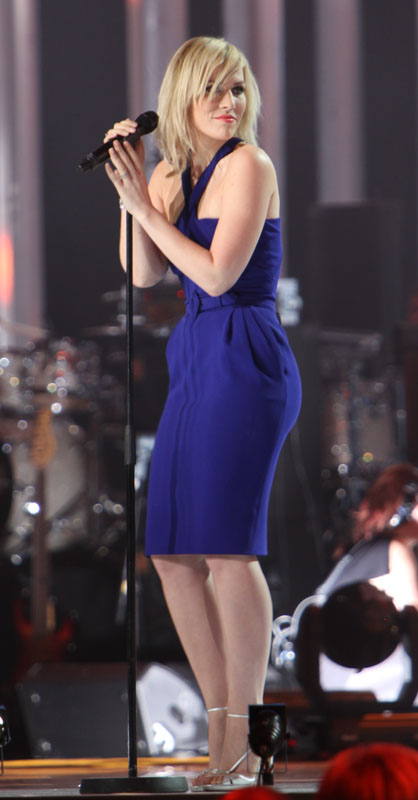
Bedingfield at the Nobel Peace Prize Concert in December 2009

Bedingfield began work on her third studio album in early 2009. In 2010, she confirmed that she was working with Brian Kennedy, Wyclef Jean, Sam Sparro and Mike Elizondo and that the album would be released by the end of the year. That year, Bedingfield appeared as a featured artist on "Last Chance" by Nicki Minaj from Pink Friday, and on "Easy" by Rascal Flatts from Nothing Like This, the latter of which was released as a single. She was also a celebrity judge for Avon Voices.

Bedingfield's third studio album, Strip Me was released exclusively in North America on 7 December 2010. It was preceded by the singles "Touch" on 18 May 2010 and "Strip Me" on 21 September 2010. The album was not released in Europe until the following year on 13 May 2011 under the title Strip Me Away. In Europe, the album was preceded by the first European single release of "Pocketful of Sunshine" on 15 April; the song had been originally released as the second single from her US album Pocketful of Sunshine three years prior. On 26 April 2011, Bedingfield was featured on Simple Plan's single "Jet Lag", the first single from their fourth studio album Get Your Heart On!. That year, Bedingfield co-wrote the song "Lighthouse" for Filipino singer Jake Zyrus's second studio album Infinity. In November 2011, Bedingfield released the Christmas song "Shake Up Christmas", which was featured in television advertisements for Coca-Cola that aired during the 2011 holiday season.

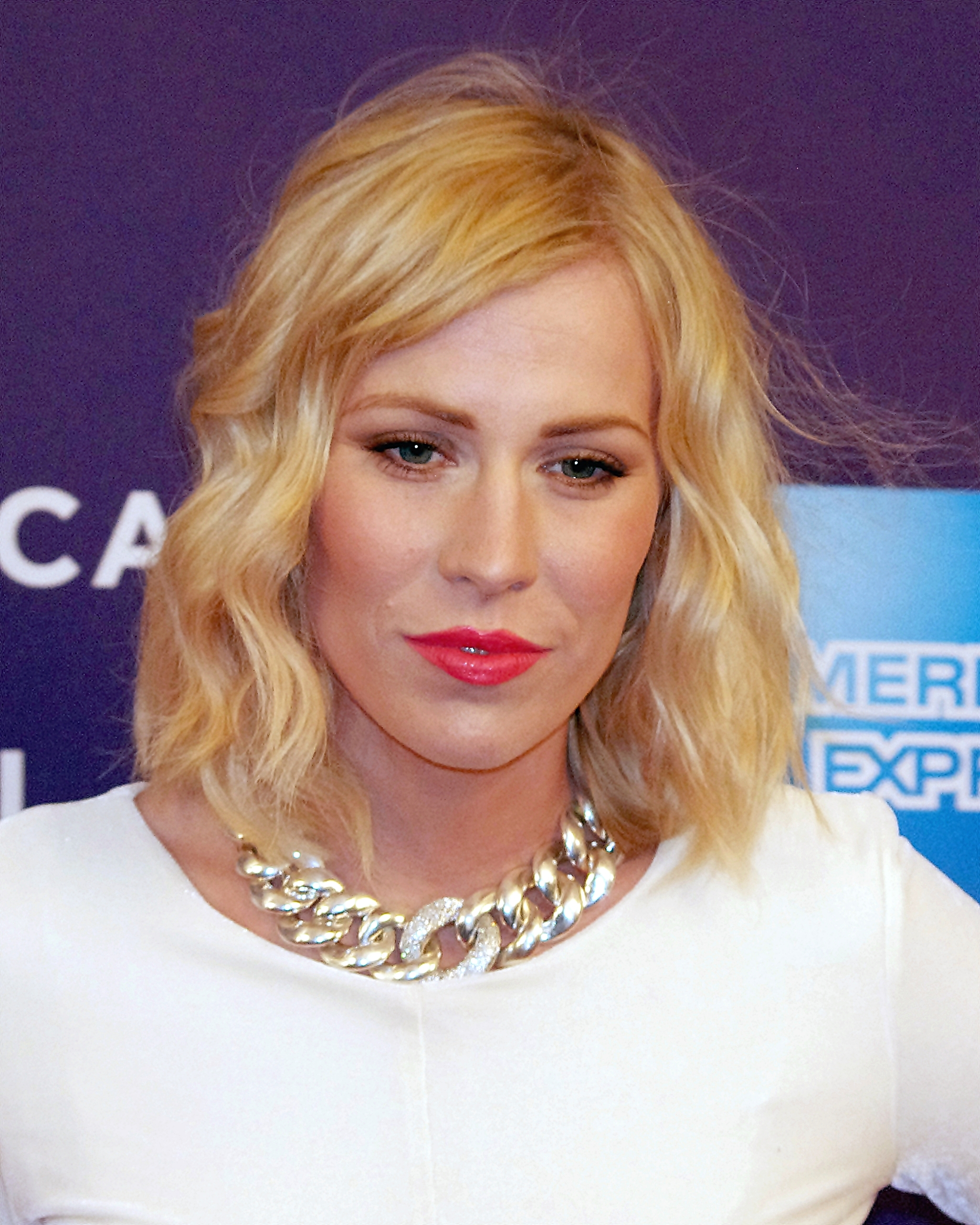
Bedingfield at the 2012 Tribeca Film Festival

In April 2012, Bedingfield announced that she was working on her fourth studio album, originally titled The Next Chapter. The album was said to feature production from RedOne, Dr. Luke, Benny Blanco, Paul Williams and Marshall Altman, but a release of an album under that name never materialized following several delays. In September 2012, Bedingfield was featured on Lifehouse's single "Between the Raindrops". On 13 May 2013, she appeared as a guest judge on the New Zealand version of The X Factor alongside her brother Daniel Bedingfield.

In 2013, Bedingfield composed the music of "Non mi ami", a single by Italian singer-songwriter Giorgia, included on the album Senza Paura. In 2014, Bedingfield contributed to the soundtrack for the Disney animated film, The Pirate Fairy, with a track titled "Who I Am". On 13 January 2015, Bedingfield released a charity single with Philosophy Skin Care titled "Hope". Later in 2015, Bedingfield contributed to Band of Merrymakers' album Welcome to Our Christmas Party and toured with the group in 2015 and 2016. Bedingfield also collaborated with Belgian record producer Basto during this time. The duo released a single titled "Unicorn" in March 2016.

Bedingfield toured Europe in late 2016 with Night of the Proms. In January 2017 it was announced that Bedingfield would open for Train's 2017 summer concert tour. On 10 March 2017 she appeared on the soundtrack of Tangled: Before Ever After in the track "More of Me".

=== 2018–2024: Roll with Me and "Unwritten" resurgence ===
Bedingfield released a new record, "Let Go" with Nestea on 17 March 2018. She signed a record deal with Linda Perry's record label We Are Hear in the same year. Bedingfield co-wrote the song "Black Sky" with Kimbra for her 2018 album Primal Heart. In July 2019, Bedingfield announced that her fourth studio album and first studio release in nearly nine years, Roll with Me, which was released on 30 August 2019. Before the announcement, she had released the song "Roller Skate" as the album's lead single on 19 July and was preceded by its second single "Kick It". In 2022 she featured as the opening act for Lewis Capaldi. In 2023, the song "Unwritten" featured in the film Anyone but You, which generated renewed interest in the song. She performed the song together with stars of the movie, Sydney Sweeney and Glen Powell, at the People's Choice Awards.

=== 2025–present: Further music and collaborations ===
Natasha Bedingfield performing at the Baloise Session, Event Halle Messe Basel, 20 October 2026.

Bedingfield collaborated on the Other Girl Version of "Alibi", with Ella Henderson and Rudimental; the single was released on 5 April 2024. In August 2024, Bedingfield performed for the British athletes at the Paris Olympics together with Cat Burns.

After loan player Jaidon Anthony had sung “Unwritten” at his initiation ahead of the 2024/25 season, the first team players for EFL Championship side Burnley F.C. adopted the song to help motivate them on match days. Bedingfield made a surprise appearance on the Turf Moor pitch following the final game of the season on 3 May 2025 to perform the song, followed by “These Words”.

On 14 August 2026, Bedingfield released the single "Dot Dot Dot".

== Philanthropy ==
Bedingfield has donated time and money to organisations such as the Global Angels, an international children's charity founded by her mother, Molly Bedingfield. She became associated with the organisation in 2006 and said she hoped to help "people around the world, particularly children, who live in conditions that would horrify us".

Bedingfield is now an ambassador for Global Angels; in November 2006 she visited India for three weeks in support of the charity. She visited an orphanage in Kolkata and a refugee camp for former child prostitutes in Mumbai to learn more about the situation and the conditions in these areas. Bedingfield later expressed her shock at what she had witnessed. Video diaries filmed during her trip were posted on her official website in early 2007. She is also an advocate for Stop the Traffik, a global coalition which works to end human trafficking and a member of the (RED) campaign. In a 2008 rockumentary, Call+Response, headed by Justin Dillon, Bedingfield performed acoustic versions of "Unwritten" and "Soulmate" in support of the film's cause: a movement against modern slavery and human trafficking.

== Non-musical projects ==
In 2004, Bedingfield showed interest in acting and made her debut in the James Bond video game From Russia with Love in November 2005. She voiced the character Elizabeth Stark, the British Prime Minister's daughter who is kidnapped in the opening sequence. Bedingfield commented that she would like to do more acting, but only if the film "was good enough, and it was a role that [would] fit me." She has made an appearance in the seventh-season finale of the Canadian television series Degrassi: The Next Generation. Bedingfield also guest-starred on Nickelodeon's mockumentary series The Naked Brothers Band's "Christmas Special" alongside Whoopi Goldberg and Leon Thomas III. She has made guest appearances on the NBC series Lipstick Jungle.

She guest-starred on Nickelodeon's True Jackson, VP in November 2009. She sang the song "These Words". In 2012, Bedingfield made an appearance in three episodes of Web Therapy's fourth season.

In December 2012, VH1 announced that Bedingfield would perform at their 2012 VH1 Divas show, a concert benefiting the Save The Music Foundation charity. Bedingfield performed Deee-Lite's "Groove Is in the Heart" with Bootsy Collins and Iggy Azalea.

On 22 September 2014, Bedingfield performed a song titled "Love Song to the Earth" at the United Nations 2014 Equator Prize Gala in New York City. The song is a special anthem she and Toby Gad co-wrote for the United Nations Climate Summit 2014.

In 2021, Bedingfield competed in season six of The Masked Singer as "Pepper". She was eliminated alongside John Lydon as "Jester".

== Personal life ==
On 21 March 2009, Bedingfield married American businessman Matt Robinson in Malibu, California, US. Robinson is a writer and real estate investor. In December 2017, their son was born.

== Discography ==
- Unwritten (2004)
- N.B. (2007)
- Strip Me (2010)
- Roll with Me (2019)

== Tours ==
Headlining

- Verizon VIP Tour (2008)
- Less Is More Tour (2011)
- Roll With Me Tour (2019)

Co-headlining

- Energy Music Tour (with Sophie Ellis-Bextor and Fall Out Boy) (2007)
- Night of the Proms (with Ronan Keating and Simple Minds) (2016)

Opening act

- C'mon C'mon Tour (for Sheryl Crow) (2004)
- FutureSex/LoveShow (for Justin Timberlake) (2007)
- New Kids on the Block Live (New Kids on the Block) (2008)
- Play That Song Tour (for Train) (2017)
- Timeless Tour (for Meghan Trainor) (2024)

== Filmography ==
=== Television ===
| Year | Title | Role | Notes |
|---|---|---|---|
| 2008 | Lipstick Jungle | Herself | Soundtrack |
| 2008 | Degrassi: The Next Generation | Herself | Seventh season finale |
| 2008 | The Naked Brothers Band | Herself | Christmas special |
| 2009 | True Jackson, VP | Herself | |
| 2012 | Web Therapy | Gemma Pankhurst-Jones | Season four |
| 2014 | Hell's Kitchen | Herself | Attended Season 12's final service as a chef's table guest in Scott Commings' kitchen. |
| 2016 | The New Celebrity Apprentice | Herself | Performed as a part of the final task for Boy George's team |
| 2017 | Tangled: The Series | Herself | Soundtrack |
| 2021 | The Masked Singer | Herself/Pepper | Season 6 contestant; Eliminated in eighth episode |

=== Video games ===
| Year | Title | Voice Role | Notes |
|---|---|---|---|
| 2005 | James Bond 007: From Russia with Love | Elizabeth Stark | Also Likeness |

== Awards and nominations ==
Bedingfield's debut album Unwritten contained primarily uptempo pop songs and was influenced by R&B music. It enjoyed international success with over three million copies sold worldwide. In 2007, she received a Grammy Award nomination for "Best Female Pop Vocal Performance" for the song "Unwritten", the third single from the album Unwritten. Bedingfield's second album N.B. yielded the singles "Soulmate"; "Say It Again"; and "I Wanna Have Your Babies", written and produced by Natasha Bedingfield, Wayne Wilkins, Andrew Frampton and Steve Kipner. Bedingfield has received four nominations from the BRIT Awards but has won none. As of July 2008, she has won five awards from eleven nominations.

BMI London Awards

| Year | Nominee / work | Award | Result | Ref. |
|---|---|---|---|---|
| 2006 | "These Words" | Pop Award | Won | |
| 2006 | "Unwritten" | Pop Award | Won | |
| 2007 | "Unwritten" | Song of the Year | Won | |
| 2007 | "Unwritten" | Cable Award | Won | |
| 2007 | "Unwritten" | Pop Award | Won | |
| 2007 | "Single" | Pop Award | Won | |
| 2008 | "Unwritten" | Cable Award | Won | |
| 2009 | "Unwritten" | Cable Award | Won | |
| 2009 | "Pocketful of Sunshine" | Song of the Year | Won | |
| 2009 | "Pocketful of Sunshine" | College Award | Won | |
| 2009 | "Pocketful of Sunshine" | Pop Award | Won | |

Billboard Music Awards

The Billboard Music Awards honor artists for commercial performance in the U.S., based on record charts published by Billboard. The awards are based on sales data by Nielsen SoundScan and radio information by Nielsen Broadcast Data Systems. The award ceremony was held from 1990 to 2007, until its reintroduction in 2011.

| Year | Nominee / work | Award | Result |
|---|---|---|---|
| 2006 | "Unwritten" | Pop 100 Airplay Song of the Year | Nominated |
| 2008 | Herself | Top Hot Dance Club Play Artist | Nominated |
| 2008 | Herself | Top Hot Dance Airplay Artist | Nominated |

Billboard Touring Awards

Established in 2004, the Billboard Touring Awards is an annual meeting sponsored by Billboard magazine which also honors the top international live entertainment industry artists and professionals.

| Year | Nominee / work | Award | Result |
|---|---|---|---|
| 2011 | Natasha Bedingfield Less Is More Tour Presented By Freschetta | Concert Marketing & Promotion Award | Nominated |

BRIT Awards

The BRIT Awards are the British Phonographic Industry's annual pop music awards. Bedingfield has received four nominations.

| Year | Nominee / work | Award | Result |
|---|---|---|---|
| 2005 | Natasha Bedingfield | British Female Solo Artist | Nominated |
| 2005 | Natasha Bedingfield | British Breakthrough Act | Nominated |
| 2005 | Natasha Bedingfield | British Pop Act | Nominated |
| 2005 | "These Words" | British Single | Nominated |

BT Digital Music Awards

The BT Digital Music Awards honour music distributed digitally by methods such as mobile devices, online downloads and blogging. Bedingfield has won one award.

| Year | Nominee / work | Award | Result |
|---|---|---|---|
| 2005 | Natasha Bedingfield | Best Use of Mobile | Won |
| 2007 | Natasha Bedingfield | Artist of the Year | Nominated |
| 2007 | Natasha Bedingfield | Best Pop Artist | Won |

CMT Music Awards

| Year | Nominee / work | Award | Result | Ref. |
|---|---|---|---|---|
| 2012 | "Easy" (with Rascal Flatts) | Video of the Year | Nominated | |
| 2012 | "Easy" (with Rascal Flatts) | Collaborative Video of the Year | Nominated | |

Disney Channel Kids Awards

| Year | Nominee / work | Award | Result | Ref. |
|---|---|---|---|---|
| 2004 | Natasha Bedingfield | Best Newcomer | Nominated | |
| 2004 | "These Words" | Best Single | Nominated | |

Glamour Awards

| Year | Nominee / work | Award | Result | Ref. |
|---|---|---|---|---|
| 2005 | Natasha Bedingfield | UK Solo Artist | Won | |

Grammy Awards

The Grammy Awards are awarded annually by the National Academy of Recording Arts and Sciences. Bedingfield has received one nomination.

| Year | Nominee / work | Award | Result |
|---|---|---|---|
| 2007 | "Unwritten" | Best Female Pop Vocal Performance | Nominated |

Groovevolt Music and Fashion Awards

| Year | Nominee / work | Award | Result | Ref. |
|---|---|---|---|---|
| 2006 | Natasha Bedingfield | Best New Artist | Nominated | |

Hit FM Music Awards

The Hit FM Music Awards was established in 2008 to honour excellence in Western music based on a public-voted process.

| Year | Nominee / work | Award | Result |
|---|---|---|---|
| 2009 | "Pocketful of Sunshine" | Song of the Year | Nominated |

Ivor Novello Awards

The Ivor Novello Awards are awarded for songwriting and composing. The awards, named after the Cardiff born entertainer Ivor Novello, are presented annually in London by the British Academy of Songwriters, Composers and Authors (BASCA).

| Year | Nominee / work | Award | Result |
|---|---|---|---|
| 2005 | "These Words" | Best Song Musically And Lyrically | Nominated |

MTV Europe Music Awards

The MTV Europe Music Awards is an annual awards ceremony established in 1994 by MTV Europe. Bedingfield has received one nomination.

| Year | Nominee / work | Award | Result |
|---|---|---|---|
| 2004 | Natasha Bedingfield | Best UK and Ireland act | Nominated |

Meteor Music Awards

Launched in 2001, the Meteor Music Awards are awarded for achievements in the Irish and international record industry.

| Year | Nominee / work | Award | Result |
|---|---|---|---|
| 2005 | Herself | Best International Female | Nominated |

Music Video Production Awards

The MVPA Awards are annually presented by a Los Angeles-based music trade organization to honor the year's best music videos.

| Year | Nominee / work | Award | Result |
|---|---|---|---|
| 2006 | "These Words" | Best Pop Video | Nominated |
| 2006 | "These Words" | Best Colorist/Telecine | Nominated |
| 2006 | "These Words" | Best Special Effects | Nominated |

New Music Awards

The New Music Awards are given for excellence in music to both recording artists and radio stations by New Music Weekly magazine.

| Year | Nominee / work | Award | Result |
|---|---|---|---|
| 2006 | "Unwritten" | AC Single of the Year | Won |
| 2008 | Natasha Bedingfield | AC Female Artist of the Year | Won |

People's Choice Awards

The People's Choice Awards is an American awards show recognising the people and the work of popular culture. The show has been held annually since 1975 and is voted on by the general public.

| Year | Nominee / work | Award | Result |
|---|---|---|---|
| 2009 | "Love Like This" (feat. Sean Kingston) | Favourite Combined Forces | Nominated |

Pop Awards

Pop Magazine is an online music magazine created by Hotspot Entertainment and published by A-Z Publishings. The magazine was launched on April 24, 2014. In 2018, Pop Magazine launched the first annual Pop Awards with 25 nominees across 5 categories.

| Year | Nominee / work | Award | Result |
|---|---|---|---|
| 2020 | "Roller Skate" | Song of the Year | Nominated |

Radio Disney Music Awards

The Radio Disney Music Awards (RDMA) is an annual awards show which is operated and governed by Radio Disney, an American radio network. Beginning in 2013, the ceremony began to be televised on Disney Channel.

| Year | Nominee / work | Award | Result |
|---|---|---|---|
| 2006 | "Unwritten" | Best Song to Listen to While Getting Ready for School | Nominated |

Smash Hits Poll Winners Party

The Smash Hits Poll Winners Party was an awards ceremony which ran from 1988 to 2005. Each award winner was voted by readers of the Smash Hits magazine.

| Year | Nominee / work | Award | Result |
|---|---|---|---|
| 2004 | Herself | Hot New Talent | Won |
| 2004 | "These Words" | Favorite Download | Nominated |

TMF Awards

The TMF Awards is an annual television awards show broadcast live on The Music Factory. Bedingfield has received one award.

| Year | Nominee / work | Award | Result |
|---|---|---|---|
| 2005 | Natasha Bedingfield | Best International New Artist | Won |

Teen Choice Awards

The Teen Choice Awards were established in 1999 to honor the year's biggest achievements in music, movies, sports and television, being voted by young people aged between 13 and 19.

| Year | Nominee / work | Award | Result |
|---|---|---|---|
| 2006 | Natasha Bedingfield | Choice Music: Breakout Artist - Female | Nominated |

Žebřík Music Awards

| Year | Nominee / work | Award | Result | Ref. |
|---|---|---|---|---|
| 2004 | Natasha Bedingfield | Best International Surprise | Nominated | |

== See also ==
- List of songs written by Natasha Bedingfield
