= Soulmate (Natasha Bedingfield song) =

2007 single by Natasha Bedingfield

Single by Natasha Bedingfield

from the album N.B. and Pocketful of Sunshine
- B-side: "Chasing Cars"
- Released: 2 July 2007
- Genre: Pop
- Length: 3:32
- Label: Phonogenic
- Songwriters: Natasha Bedingfield; Mads Hauge; David Tench
- Producers: Bedingfield; Patrick Leonard

Natasha Bedingfield singles chronology
"I Wanna Have Your Babies" (2007)	"Soulmate" (2007)	"Love Like This" (2007)

Music video
- "Soulmate" on YouTube

"Soulmate" is a song written and produced by Natasha Bedingfield, Mads Hauge and David Tench for Bedingfield's second album, N.B. (2007). The song is written in the key of E-flat minor and set in 4/4 time. Bedingfield's vocals range from F_{3} to D♯_{5}. The lyrics discuss if there is a soulmate for everyone and if Bedingfield will ever find the right partner. The song was released as the album's second single in July 2007. It was a commercial success, and the most successful single from N.B., reaching number seven in the United Kingdom and the top forty in the majority of the charts it entered. "Soulmate" is also the fourth single released in 2008 for the North American version of N.B., titled Pocketful of Sunshine.

The song gained popularity in the U.S after it was played in an episode of the highly rated MTV program The Hills. Promotion for the single started months after its release, in April 2009. She performed it on The Ellen DeGeneres Show, 15 April and Dancing with the Stars on 21 April. The song was also used throughout the final episode of season 5 of the TV series Medium and the finale of The Bachelorette's fourth season following Jesse Csincsak's proposal to DeAnna Pappas.

== Critical reception ==
The song received mixed reviews from critics in the United Kingdom. Paul Taylor of the Manchester Evening News called the song "impassioned", but IndieLondon.co.uk called the track "far too sentimental" and rated it two out of five stars. In a review for the BBC, Lizzie Ennever named the song one of the "obviously 'not-so-great' tracks" from N.B., comparing it to Australian singer Tina Arena.

== Chart performance ==
"Soulmate" debuted on the UK Singles Chart at number seventy on 17 June 2007; three weeks later the song climbed to the peak position of number seven. In Ireland, "Soulmate" debuted at number thirty-nine on 5 July 2007. It peaked at number twenty-eight a week later.

The single had moderate success in Europe. In Switzerland, "Soulmate" reached number seven and remained on the singles chart for a total of eighteen weeks. Elsewhere, it reached the top ten in Norway and the top twenty in Austria, Finland, Germany, Poland and Spain. In the United States, before even being released, it charted at No. 70 on Hot Digital Songs and No. 74 on the Pop 100, as well as on the Bubbling Under the Hot 100 at No. 3. Airplay increased and the single reached No. 14 on the Hot Adult Top 40 Tracks. "Soulmate" also debuted on the US Hot 100 at No. 96. In Germany, the single was certified Gold in year 2009, two years after the release. It is her first certification from that country.

== Music video ==
The music video was directed by Mark Pellington and was filmed in Los Angeles, California on 10 May and 11 May 2007. The video begins with a close-up of Bedingfield in a dark room. As the video proceeds, the camera slowly zooms out, revealing the room which contains a sofa and a mirror. Shots of Bedingfield in a grey dress in front of a light background, people kissing and skyscrapers are intercut throughout the video. It premiered 6 June 2007 on Yahoo! UK.

== Formats and track listings ==
UK CD single
(88697111992; Released 2 July 2007)

1. "Soulmate"
2. "Chasing Cars" (Live at BBC Radio 1 Live Lounge)

Australian CD single
(88697125472; Released 6 August 2007)

1. "Soulmate"
2. "Chasing Cars" (Live at BBC Radio 1 Live Lounge)
3. "I Wanna Have Your Babies" (Kardinal Beats Remix)
4. "Soulmate" music video

Digital download
(Released 5 June 2007)

1. "Soulmate"
2. "Chasing Cars" (Live at BBC Radio 1 Live Lounge)

iTunes digital download
(Released 2 July 2007)

1. "Soulmate" (AOL Session Live)

Official remixes

1. "Soulmate" (Bimbo Jones Radio Edit)
2. "Soulmate" (Bimbo Jones Club Mix)

== Personnel ==
The following people contributed to "Soulmate".

- Natasha Bedingfield – lead vocals, bongos, production
- Patrick Leonard – production
- Michelle Andrews – guitar
- Mads Hauge – vocal production
- David Tench – vocal production
- Vanessa Freebirn – cello, string arrangements

- Carla Campell, Neel Hammond – violins
- Manny Marroquin – mixing
- Jared Robbins – mixing assistant
- Darnell McEuchgain – beatboxing
- Kieran McGuiness – vocals

== Charts ==
=== Weekly charts ===
Chart (2007–2008)	Peak position
Austria (Ö3 Austria Top 40)	7
Belgium (Ultratip Bubbling Under Flanders)	17
Canada Hot 100 (Billboard)	79
CIS Airplay (TopHit)	192
Finland (Suomen virallinen lista)	13
Germany (GfK)	12
Ireland (IRMA)	28
Netherlands (Dutch Top 40)	24
Netherlands (Single Top 100)	24
Norway (VG-lista)	8
Scottish Singles Sales (Official Charts)	6
Switzerland (Schweizer Hitparade)	7
UK Singles (Official Charts)	7
US Billboard Hot 100	96
US Adult Pop Airplay (Billboard)	14
US Pop 100 (Billboard)	74

=== Year-end charts ===
Chart (2007)	Position
Europe (Eurochart Hot 100)	94
Germany (Media Control GfK)	44
Switzerland (Schweizer Hitparade)	41
UK Singles (OCC)	101

Chart (2008)	Position
Austria (Ö3 Austria Top 40)	44

== Certifications ==
Region	Certification	Certified units/sales
Germany (BVMI)	Gold	150,000^{^}
^{^} Shipments figures based on certification alone.

== Release history ==
Region	Date
United Kingdom	2 July 2007
Germany	3 August 2007
Australia	6 August 2007
Canada	9 December 2008
United States	9 December 2008
