= N.B. (album) =

Studio album by Natasha Bedingfield
- Released: 27 April 2007
- Genre: Pop; R&B
- Length: 47:22
- Label: Phonogenic
- Producer: Natasha Bedingfield; Mike Elizondo; Danja; Tom Rothrock; Greg Kurstin; Mads Hauge; Steve Kipner; Wayne Rodrigues; Andrew Frampton; Wayne Wilkins

Natasha Bedingfield chronology
Unwritten (2004)	N.B. (2007)	Pocketful of Sunshine (2008)

Singles from N.B.
- 1. "I Wanna Have Your Babies" Released: 12 March 2007; 2. "Soulmate" Released: 2 July 2007

N.B. is the second studio album released by British singer Natasha Bedingfield. It was released in the United Kingdom on 30 April 2007 through Phonogenic Records. Bedingfield worked with a mix of new producers, including Mike Elizondo, Danja, and Greg Kurstin, and reteamed with her Unwritten collaborators, Steve Kipner, Wayne Rodrigues, Andrew Frampton, and Wayne Wilkins. N.B. represented a thematic shift, exploring relationships and the complexities of sharing one’s life.

Reviews for N.B. were mixed, with critics praising its ambition, production, and Bedingfield's vocal performance, while others criticized its uneven songwriting, lack of risk-taking, and weaker tracks. The album fell short of matching the success of her debut Unwritten (2004), peaking at number nine on the UK Albums Chart and receiving a Gold certification for sales exceeding 100,000 units, while attaining only moderate positions in international markets and failing to chart in several countries.

The album produced two top ten hits, "I Wanna Have Your Babies" and "Soulmate," with the former achieving moderate chart success. Follow-up, "Soulmate," released in July 2007, performed better internationally, reaching the top ten in several countries and earning a Gold certification in Germany. Following several delays, N.B. was reissued in North America under the name Pocketful of Sunshine (2008) with new packaging and an alternative track listing featuring only six of the original songs.

== Background ==
In September 2004, Bedingfield released her debut album Unwritten on Phonogenic Records. It received generally favorable reviews for its polished production and broad pop appeal, and debuted at number one on the UK Albums Chart, eventually selling one million copies in the United Kingdom. Internationally, it reached the top ten in several European countries and charted within the top 30 in North America and Japan, with total worldwide sales of 2.3 million copies. The album earned Bedingfield multiple Brit Award and Grammy Award nominations and produced several successful singles, including "Single", "These Words", "Unwritten", and "I Bruise Easily," with "These Words" becoming her first UK number one and "Unwritten" receiving extensive radio airplay in the United States.

For her next project, Bedingfield consulted a diverse range of producers, combining her love of urban music with her pop sensibilities. She worked with Mike Elizondo, J.R. Rotem, Danja, and Rich Harrison, alongside Unwritten writers Steve Kipner, Wayne Wilkins and Andrew Frampton. She also collaborated with Maroon 5 lead singer Adam Levine on a song for the album. Thematically, N.B. marked a shift from her debut, focusing on a new life chapter and the need for relationships, exploring both their challenges and joys, as well as the questions that arise when sharing one’s life with another. Bedingfield approached the album without pressure, feeling confident after the success of Unwritten and believing she had more to give, stating that she was not nervous about following up her debut.

== Music and lyrics ==
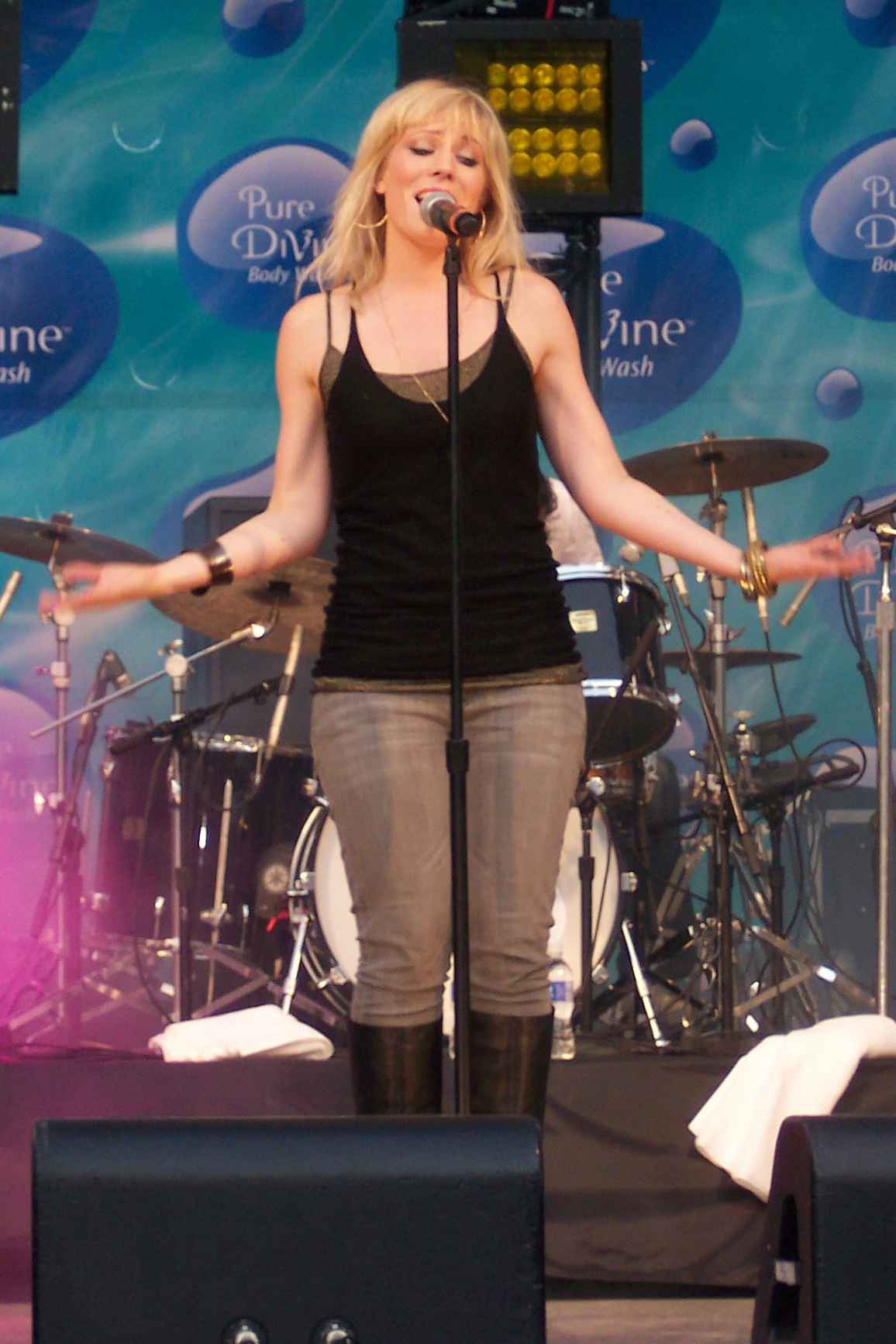
N.B. shifted its focus to the challenges and dynamics of personal relationships.

"How Do You Do?", the opening track about flirting, features guitars and a horn section. "I Wanna Have Your Babies", the second track, was chosen as the lead single as it was a representation Bedingfield's shifting priorities from being a single young woman to "dating, searching for a partner" and "looking for Mr Right". The song discusses a woman's battle to stop herself from rushing into relationships in an effort to find the right man to be the father of her children. The second single, "Soulmate", is a ballad on which Bedingfield wonders if there is a partner for everyone.

"Who Knows", the fourth track, begins with a "reggae-pop vibe" which slowly progresses to an electro-style sound featuring a string section. It received positive reviews, with one reviewer stating that it was reminiscent of "Amy Winehouse's gruff vocal style and her sassiness". "Who Knows" was also featured in the motion picture 27 Dresses. The fifth track is "Say It Again". It is co-written with Mike Elizondo and Maroon 5's lead singer Adam Levine, who also provides backing vocals on the song. "Pirate Bones" discusses the pitfalls of celebrity and fame. On the song Bedingfield commented "if you're giving up your enjoyment of life for somebody else's idea of success, it's like being a pirate who's got his hoard of treasure and is sitting on an island where there are no shops to spend it. It doesn't mean anything."

The eighth track, "Tricky Angel", was inspired by R&B music and was composed around a series of piano loops. "When You Know You Know" features an orchestra and its lyrics discuss a failing relationship. The tenth track, "(No More) What Ifs", features a rap by Eve and received negative reviews, with The Guardian describing it as "an ill-advised move for all concerned". "Not Givin' Up", features a heavy urban beat with electronic sound effects in the background. The song was well received by critics because of its "near-certain crossover appeal for both sides of the Atlantic". "Still Here", the twelfth track, was originally recorded for the film Rocky Balboa in 2006, but was not included on the soundtrack. The song was later covered by Jennifer Hudson and included on her 2010 second album, I Remember Me.

== Singles ==
"I Wanna Have Your Babies," drawing inspiration from Bedingfield's extended US tours and her reflections on relationships, was released as the album's lead single in March 2007. The song received mixed reviews and achieved moderate chart success, reaching the top 10 in the United Kingdom and Ireland and charting across Europe and Australia. "Soulmate" was released as the second single from N.B. on 2 July 2007. It outperformed "I Wanna Have Your Babies," debuting at number 70 on the UK Singles Chart on 17 June 2007 and climbing to a peak of number seven three weeks later, while in Ireland it reached number 28. The song also achieved greater international success, entering the top ten in Norway, the top twenty in Austria, Finland, Germany, Poland, and Spain, and peaking at number seven in Switzerland, where it remained on the chart for eighteen weeks. In 2009, it was certified Gold in Germany. In the United Kingdom, "Say It Again" was released as promotional single from the album on 7 October 2007.

== Critical reception ==
Professional ratings
Review scores
Source	Rating
Digital Spy	3/5 stars
Entertainment.ie	2/5 stars
The Guardian	3/5 stars
The Independent	3/5 stars
The Observer	3/5 stars
Stylus Magazine	B
Yahoo! Music UK	6/10

Reviews for N.B. were mixed, with some critics praising its ambition and production while others found it uneven. BBC editor Lizzie Ennever described the album as an enjoyable and ambitious effort with a funky, urban sound, noting that while its genre-hopping and dense array of influences can occasionally feel unfocused, its strengths far outweigh the flaws, with numerous tracks standing out despite a few weaker moments. Writing for Stylus Magazine, Chris Boeckmann observed that "occasionally, Bedingfield drops a dud (the useless Sean Kingston ballad "Love Like This," the mid-tempo bore "Backyard"), but for the most part, N.B. is loaded with memorable, well-produced tracks." The Independent's Andy Gill noted that while Bedingfield largely sticks to her debut's R&B style on N.B., the album shines when she experiments. Marie Claire editor Rose Longhurst wrote that "many of the tracks are forgettable," but Bedingfield's "strong voice and eccentricities elevate her above many blonde and bland popstars."

Bernard Zuel of the Sydney Morning Herald described it as "nothing astonishing here but if you've got a teenage or pre-teen girl in the house, slip this on one morning. You'll be allowed to sing along, too." Other critics were less impressed. Dan Gennoe from Yahoo! Music UK called the album "good clean fun, entertaining and inoffensive," but criticized its lack of risk-taking, noting that Bedingfield continued her "grown-up cartoon pop" rather than trying something new, leaving little chance of it being considered a classic album. Entertainment.ie reviewer Sheena McGinley was even harsher, calling it "too embarrassing to listen to in public" and giving it two out of five stars. The Guardian critic Craig McLean similarly felt the album had "nothing as catchy as 'Unwritten,'" with tunes "on the airy-fairy side of breezy, and the lyrics on the naff side of plain." Steve Jelbert from The Times described N.B. as "patchy and disappointing," awarding it two out of five stars. He remarked that the album "attempts to cover the emotional range of a chick-lit novel, with limited success [...] the faux-soul of "When You Know You Know" is too mechanical to convince, "Backyard" is barely believable, and Bedingfield's bellow overwhelms the harmless power ballad "Still Here"." Digital Spy critic Nick Levine concluded that "the six million souls who bought into Bedingfield first time around are unlikely to be disappointed."

== Commercial performance ==
N.B. failed to replicate the commercial success of Bedingfield's debut album Unwritten (2004). In the United Kingdom, it debuted and peaked at number nine on the UK Albums Chart for the week of 6 May 2007, selling 19,500 copies in its first week. The album would spend a total of 13 weeks within the UK Top 100. This was a considerable decline from her previous effort, which had opened at number-one and spent a total of 29 weeks on the chart. On 22 July 2013, six years after its release, N.B. was certified Gold by the British Phonographic Industry (BPI).

Outside of the United Kingdom, the album failed to reach the top ten. N.B. reached its highest peak in the Netherlands, Ireland, and Scotland, where it peaked at number 13 on the Dutch Albums Chart, number 14 on the Irish Albums Chart, and number 16 on the Scottish Albums Chart.In Switzerland, the album debuted at number 52 on the Swiss Albums Chart and dropped off after five weeks, but later re-entered the chart following the success of "Soulmate," ultimately reaching a peak position of number 37 in September 2007. In Australia, N.B. failed to enter the top one hundred, but peaked at number eleven on the Hitseekers albums chart.

== Track listing ==
N.B. – Standard edition
No.	Title	Writer(s)	Producer(s)	Length
1.	"How Do You Do?"	Natasha Bedingfield; Steve Kipner; Andrew Frampton; Wayne Wilkins	Bedingfield; Kipner; Frampton; Wilkins	3:41
2.	"I Wanna Have Your Babies"	Bedingfield; Kipner; Frampton; Wilkins	Bedingfield; Kipner; Frampton; Wilkins	3:37
3.	"Soulmate"	Bedingfield; David Tench; Mads Hauge	Patrick Leonard; Bedingfield	3:32
4.	"Who Knows"	Bedingfield; Mike Elizondo	Elizondo	3:46
5.	"Say It Again"	Bedingfield; Adam Levine; Elizondo	Elizondo	3:30
6.	"Pirate Bones"	Bedingfield; Kipner; Frampton; Wilkins	Bedingfield; Kipner; Frampton; Wilkins	3:47
7.	"Backyard"	Bedingfield; Greg Kurstin	Bedingfield; Kurstin	3:27
8.	"Tricky Angel"	Bedingfield; Kipner; Wilkins	Bedingfield; Kipner; Wilkins	3:04
9.	"When You Know You Know"	Bedingfield; Danielle Brisebois; Wayne Rodrigues; Larry Blackmon; Zaire Black	Bedingfield; Brisebois; Rodrigues	2:50
10.	"I Think They're Thinking" (Interlude)			0:58
11.	"(No More) What Ifs" (featuring Eve)	Bedingfield; Kipner; Frampton; Eve Jeffers	Bedingfield; Kipner; Frampton; Elizondo	4:06
12.	"Not Givin' Up"	Bedingfield; Floyd Natheniel Hills; Kipner	Danja; Bedingfield^{[a]}; Kipner^{[a]}	3:47
13.	"Still Here"	Diane Warren	Guy Roche	3:56
14.	"Smell the Roses"	Bedingfield; Kipner; Frampton; Wilkins	Bedingfield; Kipner; Frampton; Wilkins	3:21
15.	"Lay Down" (hidden track)	Bedingfield; Tench	Elizondo	3:30
16.	"Loved by You" (hidden track)	Bedingfield	Hauge	2:35
Total length:				53:27

N.B. – Canadian digital release (bonus track)
No.	Title	Writer(s)	Producer(s)	Length
15.	"Stepping Stone"	Bedingfield; Frampton; Wilkins	Bedingfield; Frampton; Wilkins	3:51
Total length:				51:13

N.B. – International edition (bonus track)
No.	Title	Writer(s)	Producer(s)	Length
15.	"Unwritten" (Manny Marroquin Mix)	Bedingfield; Brisebois; Rodrigues	Brisebois; Rodrigues; Manny Marroquin^{[b]}	4:13
Total length:				57:40

N.B. – Japanese edition (bonus tracks)
No.	Title	Writer(s)	Producer(s)	Length
16.	"Unwritten" (Live)	Bedingfield; Brisebois; Rodrigues		6:01
17.	"What Ifs"	Bedingfield; Kipner; Frampton	Bedingfield; Kipner; Frampton; Elizondo	4:01
18.	"I Wanna Have Your Babies" (Music video)			3:36
Total length:				67:42

N.B. – Canadian iTunes Store edition (bonus tracks)
No.	Title	Writer(s)	Producer(s)	Length
15.	"Loved by You"	Bedingfield	Hauge	2:35
16.	"Stepping Stone"	Bedingfield; Frampton; Wilkins	Bedingfield; Frampton; Wilkins	3:51
17.	"Lay Down"	Bedingfield; Tench	Elizondo	3:30
Total length:				57:18

Notes

- ^{^[a]} signifies a vocal producer.
- ^{^[b]} signifies a remixer.
- Some digital releases of N.B. do not include "I Think They're Thinking (Interlude)" and/or "Lay Down" and "Loved by You".

== Personnel ==
Adapted from the AllMusic credits.

- Natasha Bedingfield – lead vocals, vocal producer, vocal arrangement
- Adam Levine – backing vocals
- Nikola Bedingfield – backing vocals
- Danielle Brisebois – backing vocals
- Jessica Collins – backing vocals
- M. Hauge – producer
- Charles Judge – keyboards
- Mike Krompass – drum engineering
- Adam MacDougall – keyboards
- Jonas Myrin – keyboards
- Nick Lashley – guitar
- Vanessa Freebirn – cello, string arrangements
- Ryan Freeland – engineer
- Adam Hawkins – engineer, mixing
- Wayne Rodrigues – digital editing, drum programming, editing, engineer, keyboards, producer, turntables, vocal arrangement
- Brian Scheuble – engineer
- Marcella "Ms. Lago" Araica – mixing
- Greg Kurstin – instrumentation, mixing, producer
- Mark "Spike" Stent – mixing
- John Akehurst – photography – mixing
- Joanne Morris – art direction – mixing
- W. Amar the Wizard Wilkins – drum programming, keyboard programming, keyboards, mixing, producer, programming

== Charts ==
=== Weekly charts ===
Weekly chart performance for N.B.
Chart (2007)	Peak position
Australian Hitseekers Albums (ARIA)	11
Dutch Albums (Album Top 100)	13
German Albums (Offizielle Top 100)	80
Irish Albums (IRMA)	14
Scottish Albums (Official Charts)	16
Swiss Albums (Schweizer Hitparade)	37
UK Albums (Official Charts)	9

=== Year-end charts ===
Year-end chart performance for N.B.
Chart (2007)	Position
UK Albums (OCC)	159

== Certifications ==
Certifications for N.B.
Region	Certification	Certified units/sales
United Kingdom (BPI)	Gold	100,000^{*}
^{*} Sales figures based on certification alone.

== Release history ==
N.B. release history
Region	Date	Edition	Format(s)	Label(s)	Ref.
France	27 April 2007	Standard	CD; digital download	Sony BMG Music	
Germany	27 April 2007	Standard	CD; digital download	Sony BMG Music	
United Kingdom	30 April 2007	Standard	CD; digital download	Phonogenic	
Japan	9 May 2007	Standard	CD; digital download	Sony BMG Music	
Australia	25 May 2007	Standard	CD; digital download	Sony BMG Music	
Canada	3 January 2008	iTunes Store exclusive	Digital download	Sony BMG Music	
