= Newton Faulkner discography =

- Studio albums: 8
- Extended plays: 3
- Live albums: 1
- Compilation albums: 1
- Singles: 36
- Music videos: 9
- Other appearances: 1

This is the discography of English singer-songwriter and guitarist Newton Faulkner. He has released eight studio albums, one live album, one EP, one compilation album, 36 singles, and nine music videos.

== Albums ==
=== Studio albums ===
Title	Album details	Chart positions						Certifications (sales thresholds)
Title	Album details	UK	AUS	GER	IRE	NZ	SWI	Certifications (sales thresholds)
Hand Built by Robots	Release date: 27 July 2007; Label: Ugly Truth	1	5	50	10	31	96	BPI: 2× Platinum; ARIA: Platinum
Rebuilt by Humans	Release date: 28 September 2009; Label: Ugly Truth	3	5	—	18	—	—	BPI: Gold; ARIA: Gold
Write It on Your Skin	Release date: 9 July 2012; Label: Ugly Truth	1	32	—	25	—	—	
Studio Zoo	Release date: 26 August 2013; Label: Ugly Truth	10	—	—	51	—	—	
Human Love	Release date: 20 November 2015; Label: BMG	41	—	—	82	—	—	
Hit the Ground Running	Release date: 1 September 2017; Label: Battenberg; Format: Digital download, streaming	13	—	—	—	—	—	
Interference (Of Light)	Release date: 20 August 2021; Label: Battenberg; Format: Digital download, streaming	91	—	—	—	—	—	
Octopus	Release date: 19 September 2025; Label: Battenberg; Formats: Digital download, streaming	27	—	—	—	—	—	

== Live albums ==
Title	Album details
Live from London Digital EP	Released: 15 October 2007; Label: Ugly Truth, Blue Sky Music; Format: Digital download
iTunes Live: London Festival '09	Released: 21 July 2009; Label: Blue Sky Music; Format: Digital download
Live in London 2012	Released: 30 September 2013; Label: Concert Live; Format: Digital download

== Compilations ==
Title	Album details	Chart positions
Title	Album details	UK
The Very Best of Newton Faulkner...So Far	Release date: 8 March 2019; Label: Battenberg; Format: Digital download, streaming	51

== Extended plays ==
Title	EP details
Full Fat EP	Released: 27 March 2006; Label: Pressure; Formats: CD (later also digital download)
U.F.O. EP	Released: 2 December 2006; Label: Ugly Truth; Formats: CD (later also digital download)
Sketches EP	Released: 20 May 2012; Label: Ugly Truth; Formats: Digital download

== Singles ==
Title	Year	Peak chart positions					Album
Title	Year	UK	AUS	GER	IRE	NZ	Album
"I Need Something"	2007	107	—	—	—	—	Hand Built by Robots
"Dream Catch Me"	2007	7	5	39	46	38	Hand Built by Robots
"All I Got"	2008	59	—	—	—	—	Hand Built by Robots
"Teardrop"	2008	57	—	—	—	—	Hand Built by Robots
"I Need Something" (re-release)	2008	70	—	—	—	—	Hand Built by Robots
"Gone in the Morning"	2008	83	—	—	—	—	Hand Built by Robots
"If This Is It"	2009	56	29	—	—	—	Rebuilt by Humans
"Over and Out"	2009	—	—	—	—	—	Rebuilt by Humans
"Let's Get Together"	2009	—	—	—	—	—	Rebuilt by Humans
"I Hate Mondays"	2010	—	8	—	—	—	Non-album single
"Write It on Your Skin"	2012	54	—	—	—	—	Write It on Your Skin
"Clouds"	2012	68	—	—	—	—	Write It on Your Skin
"Losing Ground"	2013	—	—	—	—	—	Studio Zoo
"Get Free"	2015	—	—	—	—	—	Human Love
"Hit the Ground Running"	2017	—	—	—	—	—	Hit the Ground Running
"All She Needs"	2017	—	—	—	—	—	Hit the Ground Running
"Finger Tips"	2017	—	—	—	—	—	Hit the Ground Running
"Wish I Could Wake Up"	2018	—	—	—	—	—	Non-album singles
"Pure Imagination"	2018	—	—	—	—	—	Non-album singles
"Million Reasons"	2018	—	—	—	—	—	Non-album singles
"Don't Leave Me Waiting"	2019	—	—	—	—	—	Non-album singles
"I'll Be There"	2019	—	—	—	—	—	Non-album singles
"Take What You Want"	2019	—	—	—	—	—	Non-album singles
"Sinking Sand" (Note: Also on Chapter I, a three-song single.)	2020	—	—	—	—	—	Interference (Of Light)
"Together"	2020	—	—	—	—	—	Interference (Of Light)
"I Can Pretend"	2020	—	—	—	—	—	Interference (Of Light)
"Better Way" (Note: Also on Chapter II, a three-song single.)	2021	—	—	—	—	—	Interference (Of Light)
"Here Tonight"	2021	—	—	—	—	—	Interference (Of Light)
"The Sun Is Coming Up"	2021	—	—	—	—	—	Interference (Of Light)
"Four Leaf Clover"	2021	—	—	—	—	—	Interference (Of Light)
"World Away"	2021	—	—	—	—	—	Interference (Of Light)
"Back"	2021	—	—	—	—	—	Interference (Of Light)
"Leave Me Lonely"	2021	—	—	—	—	—	Interference (Of Light)
"Driving Home for Christmas" (featuring Cat Rea)	2021	—	—	—	—	—	Non-album single

== Music videos ==
Year	Song	Album	Director(s)
2006	"To the Light"	Full Fat EP	Colin Munro, Quirky Motion
2009	"Dream Catch Me"	Hand Built by Robots	
2009	"I Need Something"	Hand Built by Robots	
2009	"Gone in the Morning"	Hand Built by Robots	
2009	"Teardrop"	Hand Built by Robots	
2012	"Write It on Your Skin"	Write It on Your Skin	
2012	"Clouds"	Write It on Your Skin	
2013	"Losing Ground"	Studio Zoo	
2013	"Indecisive"	Studio Zoo	
2015	"Get Free"	Human Love	
2015	"Up Up and Away"	Human Love	

== Other appearances ==
Title	Year	Credited artist(s)	Album
"Give Peace a Chance"	2010	Orquesta Buena Vista Social Club®, Herb Armstrong, Newton Faulkner, Tim Freedman, Katie Noonan, Natalie Pa'apa'a, (Blue King Brown), Nik Phillips, Omara Portuondo, Don Spencer, Angie Whiteley, Byron Bay Steiner School, Matraville Soldiers' Settlement Public School	Non-album single
