= Write It on Your Skin =

Studio album by Newton Faulkner
- Released: 9 July 2012
- Recorded: 2009–2012
- Genre: Folk rock, pop rock
- Length: 36:37
- Label: RCA
- Producer: Newton Faulkner, Sam Farrar, David Sneddon, James Bauer-Mein, Duncan Mills, Mike Spencer

Newton Faulkner chronology
Rebuilt by Humans (2009)	Write It on Your Skin (2012)	Studio Zoo (2013)

Singles from Write It on Your Skin
- 1. "Write It on Your Skin" Released: 20 May 2012; 2. "Clouds" Released: 1 July 2012

Write It on Your Skin is the third album by British singer-songwriter Newton Faulkner, which was released on 9 July 2012. The title track "Write It on Your Skin" was released as the first single from the album, shortly followed by "Clouds".

== Reviews ==
The BBC gave a generally positive review of the album, describing it as "a late-night cocoa after a long day" - neither shocking nor amazing. Pick Up Your Broken Heart was felt to be inferior to similar heartbreak-oriented songs while Longshot was positively reviewed as a simple yet bullishly focused song.

MusicOMH gave a mixed review of 2.5 stars, indicating that while the album had excellent lyrics and vocals, it also lacked any substantive change in nature from Faulkner's previous albums.

== Production ==
Newton Faulkner described the process of this album as "very different to the other two", which was one of the reasons for changing the naming of this album, not fitting with the same tone as the others. He had written it to play live as opposed to be recorded and, as such, is more upbeat and positive than the others. "Pick Up Your Broken Heart" was written on a boat, in sessions with David Sneddon and James Bauer-Mein (The Nexus) and "Soon" was developed with Thomas Leeb. Another album collaborator was bass player Sam Farrar.

== Track listing ==
All tracks are written by Newton Faulkner, except where noted.

No.	Title	Writer(s)	Length
1.	"Pulling Teeth"		3:46
2.	"Soon"	N. Faulkner, Thomas Lee	3:50
3.	"Brick by Brick"	Sam Farrar, N. Faulkner, Toby Faulkner	3:28
4.	"Clouds"	Sam Farrar, N. Faulkner, T. Faulkner	3:18
5.	"Pick Up Your Broken Heart"		3:46
6.	"Long Shot"		3:22
7.	"Write It on Your Skin"		3:14
8.	"In the Morning"		3:29
9.	"Against the Grain"		4:27
10.	"Sugar in the Snow"		3:47

Deluxe Edition bonus tracks
No.	Title	Writer(s)	Length
11.	"Pulling Teeth" (acoustic)		3:59
12.	"I Need Something" (acoustic)		3:21
13.	"Against the Grain" (acoustic)		4:54
14.	"Brick by Brick" (acoustic)		3:30
15.	"Dream Catch Me" (acoustic)	Crispin Hunt, N. Faulkner, Gordon Mills	4:24
16.	"Write it on Your Skin" (acoustic)		4:21
