= Reverieme =

Scottish indie pop act

- Also known as: Reverie (2005–2011); Reverieme (2011–2017)
- Origin: Airdrie, Scotland
- Genres: Indie pop
- Years active: 2005–present
- Members: Louise Connell

Louise Connell (previously Reverieme) is a Scottish indie pop act from Airdrie, founded in 2005 by vocalist and guitarist Louise Connell.

In 2011, Reverieme performed at T in the Park, Wickerman and Edinburgh's The Edge Festival, receiving airplay on both BBC Radio 1 and BBC Radio 6 Music. During 2012/13, Reverieme has supported Gotye, Emmy the Great, Damon & Naomi, Jakob Dylan, Newton Faulkner, Roses, Kings, Castles, Adam Stafford and Butcher Boy amongst others. Back in the studio, Reverieme recorded a 7 track acoustic EP 'Or Else The Light', released in summer of 2015. Winning fans at BBC Radio 2, BBC Radio 6 (including Lauren Laverne's headphone moment) and Radio X, Reverieme went back to the studio to record the album Straw Woman, working with producer Stuart Macleod, which was released in June 2016.

In 2017, Louise Connell announced that she would no longer be performing under the name Reverieme and would instead be using her own name.

== History ==
=== Beginnings and Melodies (2005–2010) ===
In 2005, at the age of sixteen, singer-songwriter Louise Connell began writing and performing music under the moniker Reverie; adopting the name from a Roy Lichtenstein painting, entitled The Melody Haunts my Reverie. After recording several lo-fi demos, and performing in and around the city of Glasgow, Connell entered the studio in 2009, with producer David Anderson, to record her debut studio album, Melodies (2010). Regarding the album's recording process, Connell noted, "I would record my tracks and then [David Anderson would] do all the work making them sound as good as possible. An analogy would be that if my songs were middle-aged ladies with poor fashion sense then he'd be Gok Wan – only less annoying and without the inappropriate touching."

The album was self-released on 1 June 2010, and launched with a performance at Glasgow's The Arches. Upon its release, Melodies was received warmly by many Scottish music blogs, and support slots with Jakob Dylan (on his Women + Country world tour) and Roses, Kings, Castles followed.

=== Name change, full band and festival appearances (2011) ===
On 14 March 2011 Connell changed her moniker from Reverie to Reverieme, stating on her official Facebook account, "Get ready everyone I'm changing my pseudonym. From now on I will be performing under the moniker 'Pummel Weed'. Jk it's gonie be Reverieme instead of Reverie." On 9 May 2011, Reverieme supported Damon & Naomi on their False Beats and True Hearts tour. In the months that followed, Reverieme made festival appearances at T in the Park and Wickerman. Reverieme subsequently supported Newton Faulkner during two sold-out nights at Edinburgh's The Edge Festival. During this time, music videos for Melodies album tracks, "Get to Know Me" and "Lost at Sea" were produced, and Connell subsequently supported Emmy the Great on the Glasgow date of her Virtue tour.

On 22 August 2011, the band performed a number of songs from 'Melodies' during a session on Ally McCrae's Introducing in Scotland programme on BBC Radio 1.

=== Second studio album (2012–present) ===
Reverieme began the following year with a concert on 17 January 2012 at King Tut's Wah Wah Hut's "New Year's Revolution" festival.

On 5 March 2012, Connell supported Gotye on the Glasgow date of his Making Mirrors tour.

=== Straw Woman (2016) ===
After building a reputation as a musical innovator on her first two albums, 2010s Melodies and 2013's With Up So Floating, 2015's acoustic EP Or Else The Light set hearts fluttering with its flawless vocal delivery. Full band album, 'Straw Woman' was released on 24 June, preceded by lead single 'Golem'

== Discography ==
- Melodies (2010)
- With Up So Floating (2013)
- Or Else The Light (2015)
- "Straw Woman" (2016)
- Squall Echo Rale (2019)

== Side projects and collaborations ==
In 2011, Louise Connell made an appearance on Beerjacket's studio album, The White Feather Trail.

Guitarist and backing vocalist Andrew Lindsay fronts the Glasgow-based collective, Coat Hooks, which has included Reverieme members, Jamie Hewitt, Florence MacDonald and Louise Connell, amongst its membership. Connell makes an appearance on the band's debut EP, The Whittling (2011), with Hewitt appearing on To the Waters and the Wild (2012).
