= Morning Glory (2010 film) =

2010 film by Roger Michell

- Theatrical release poster
- Directed by: Roger Michell
- Written by: Aline Brosh McKenna
- Produced by: J. J. Abrams; Bryan Burk
- Starring: Rachel McAdams; Harrison Ford; Diane Keaton; Patrick Wilson; Jeff Goldblum
- Cinematography: Alwin Küchler
- Edited by: Dan Farrell; Nick Moore; Steven Weisberg
- Music by: David Arnold
- Production company: Bad Robot
- Distributed by: Paramount Pictures
- Release date: November 10, 2010
- Running time: 112 minutes
- Country: United States
- Language: English
- Budget: $40 million
- Box office: $60 million

Morning Glory is a 2010 American romantic comedy-drama film directed by Roger Michell and written by Aline Brosh McKenna. It stars Rachel McAdams, Harrison Ford, Diane Keaton, Patrick Wilson and Jeff Goldblum.

The film tells the story of an upstart television producer who accepts the challenge of reviving a morning show program with warring co-hosts.

Morning Glory was released in theaters on November 10, 2010, by Paramount Pictures. It received mixed reviews from critics and grossed $60 million against a $40 million budget.

== Plot ==
Aspiring news producer Becky Fuller is laid off from her job at Good Morning, New Jersey. Her mother advises she pursue another career, but Becky perseveres; IBS News, seeking a producer for its struggling national morning show, DayBreak, calls Becky for an interview.

During a job interview at IBS News, executive Jerry Barnes bluntly dismisses Becky's credentials and characterizes DayBreak as a lost cause. After this discouraging interview, she shares an elevator with veteran television journalist Mike Pomeroy, who coldly brushes off her expressions of admiration for his career achievements. Despite his initial doubts, Jerry reluctantly hires Becky as DayBreak's executive producer, prompting her move to New York City.

On her first day, Becky finds the show in turmoil, lacking both clear direction and funding. After meeting the sharp-witted, long-suffering co-host Colleen Peck, Becky fires Colleen's lecherous on-air partner, Paul McVee, to the delight of the crew. Seeking a prominent replacement, she discovers a clause in Mike Pomeroy's contract that requires him to accept a formal job offer or forfeit his salary. By invoking this clause, Becky forces the unwilling, underutilized veteran journalist to become Colleen's new co-host.

Becky meets Adam Bennett, a fellow IBS producer who had previously worked with the difficult Pomeroy on other programs. They begin dating, and he initially supports her dedication to her job. Contemptuous of morning television, Mike tries to sabotage his DayBreak debut by getting drunk. He refuses to banter, rejects segments he feels are beneath him, and antagonizes Colleen.

Jerry informs Becky that IBS wants to cancel DayBreak, blaming her for the show's dwindling viewership. After a heated confrontation with Mike, she takes a radical approach. Persuading Jerry to give her the show's remaining six weeks to revitalize ratings, Becky sends Ernie, DayBreak's weatherman, on stunts such as riding roller coasters and skydiving.

Colleen joins Becky's campaign to rejuvenate the show, appearing in colorful segments that increase the show's ratings, but Jerry remains unconvinced. Adam, not realizing what is on the line, claims she is too caught up in improving the ratings. Seeing this as the type of criticism she has heard from other men, Becky walks out.

With the six-week deadline approaching, Mike surprisingly insists on covering an obscure sauerkraut festival. Becky accompanies him but soon realizes that their true destination is the Governor's summer estate. Despite her warnings that the show will be canceled, Mike confronts the Governor on charges of racketeering, breaking the story of his arrest on live television. Afterward, Mike confides in Becky, explaining that his own historical overcommitment to his career came at the expense of his family and personal life.

The on-air arrest spikes DayBreak's ratings enough to secure another year for the show and Becky receives a job offer from the Today show. Becky reconnects with Adam, but still attends a job interview with Today show executives. As they meet, DayBreak broadcasts live on the conference room monitors. When Colleen mentions on-air that Mike's refusal to adapt has driven Becky away, he walks off the main set and storms the program's demonstration kitchen. Becky watches in shock as he presents a cooking segment, expertly preparing a frittata. Moved by his gesture, she rushes back to her old studio, deciding to remain at DayBreak.

== Cast ==
- Rachel McAdams as Becky, the new executive producer of DayBreak, the fourteenth in eleven years, challenged with improving the show's ratings
- Harrison Ford as Mike Pomeroy, a serious news journalist and anchor who has worked in television for over forty years. He is unhappy at having to co-host a show that does not deal with real news stories.
- Diane Keaton as Colleen Peck, the host of DayBreak for the past eleven years, in which time she has gone through several co-hosts and executive producers
- Patrick Wilson as Adam Bennett, another producer at IBS, who begins dating Becky
- Jeff Goldblum as Jerry Barnes, a network executive, he tasks Becky with turning the show's ratings around
- Ty Burrell as Paul McVee, the co-host of DayBreak at the beginning who is fired by Becky due to his negative effect on staff morale
- John Pankow as Lenny Bergman, the long-term senior producer of the show
- Matt Malloy as Ernie Appleby, the DayBreak weatherperson
- Patti D'Arbanville as Becky's mom

In addition, George Clooney, Eva Longoria, 50 Cent, Lloyd Banks, Tony Yayo, Chris Matthews, Morley Safer, Bob Schieffer, Jonathan Bennett and Elaine Kaufman make cameo appearances as themselves.

== Production ==
The premise of the film was partially inspired by Neil Simon's The Sunshine Boys, where Harrison Ford's role was akin to Clark while Diane Keaton's role was akin to Lewis and Rachel McAdams' role was akin to Clark's nephew Ben. Screenwriter Aline Brosh McKenna and producer J. J. Abrams "dreamed of having Harrison Ford in the film" from the point of early script development. Shortly after Abrams cast Harrison Ford as Mike Pomeroy, Roger Michell took over as director.

Despite their long careers in Hollywood, Keaton and Ford had never met prior to Morning Glory. Harrison Ford explained: "We have been working in the same business, different branches of the business. She was in the intellectual branch and I was in the running, jumping, and falling down branch. So, we never had the chance to work together. But it was a real pleasure to finally get that opportunity." Morning Glory marked Keaton's and McAdams' second film together. They previously co-starred in the 2005 comedy-drama The Family Stone. Billed as a starring vehicle for McAdams, she initially felt she was unsuited to the role because "I'm not funny. So I said, 'if you need me to be funny, you might want to look somewhere else'". Roger Michell, the film's director, had a number of dinners with McAdams and persuaded her to join the cast.

=== Music ===
The film's theme song is "Strip Me" by Natasha Bedingfield. A song called "Same Changes" by The Weepies was recorded exclusively for the film. David Arnold also composed the film score. No official soundtrack was released, though the following songs were used in the film:

No.	Title	Length
1.	"Free Me" (Joss Stone)
2.	"Waiting For My Real Life To Begin" (Colin Hay)
3.	"Incredible" (Joss Stone)
4.	"New Shoes" (Paolo Nutini)
5.	"Open Spaces 4" (Ray Yates)
6.	"Prelude and Fughetta in G Major" (Johann Sebastian Bach)
7.	"Stuck in the Middle with You" (Michael Bublé)
8.	"Five PM" (Courtesy of Hollywood Edge)
9.	"Don't Hold Me Down" (Colbie Caillat)
10.	"Johnny Got a Boom Boom" (Imelda May)
11.	"Two Sleepy People" (Hoagy Carmichael)
12.	"Finale from String Quartet in B-Flat Major" (Kodály Quartet)
13.	"Happy Birthday to You" (Mildred J. Hill & Patty S. Hill)
14.	"Same Changes" (The Weepies)
15.	"Candy Shop" (50 Cent featuring Olivia)
16.	"Dance of the Sugar Plum Fairy" (Pyotr Ilyich Tchaikovsky)
17.	"Are You Here" (Corinne Bailey Rae)
18.	"Gone in the Morning" (Newton Faulkner)
19.	"Strip Me" (Natasha Bedingfield)

== Reception ==
=== Box office ===
The film was originally scheduled for release on July 30, 2010, in the United States. It was then pushed back to November 12, 2010. Finally, Paramount Pictures shifted the release date to November 10, 2010. In its opening five days, Morning Glory earned about $12 million at US box offices, which was considered a poor result. On its release date, it debuted at number 3 behind Due Date and Megamind, though the next day it dropped to fourth place when For Colored Girls beat it to third. It kept on switching from fifth to fourth place several times until November 19, when it dropped to sixth. For the week of November 19–24, it stayed at number 6 until finally sliding to tenth place. It stayed in theaters until January 20, 2011. Ultimately, the film earned more than $31 million in the United States, and over $27 million internationally for a worldwide total of almost $59 million.

The press emphasized that it was another box office disappointment for Harrison Ford. With the exception of Indiana Jones and the Kingdom of the Crystal Skull, Ford had not had a hit for a decade. Steven Zeitchik wrote in the Los Angeles Times: "What's most disappointing about "Morning Glory" is that, after a decade without a comedy, Ford's turn in something more spry was supposed to mark a new chapter by getting him back to his crowd-pleasing ways. But the movie's disappointing performance adds one more nail in a coffin that's been enveloping Ford's career, 'Buried'-style, for years." Jeff Bock, a box-office analyst with Exhibitor Relations, told TheWrap: "When Ford wears that iconic hat, he can still crack the box office bullwhip, but outside of Indy it's become a tougher case."

Rachel McAdams was disappointed that the film failed to find a larger audience, remarking that "I only hear these businesspeople: 'Well, no one was sure who it was for.'"

=== Critical response ===
On Rotten Tomatoes, Morning Glory holds an approval rating of 57% based on 186 reviews, with an average rating of 5.98/10. The website's critical consensus reads, "It's lifted by affable performances from its impeccable cast, and it's often charming – but Morning Glory is also inconsistent and derivative." On Metacritic, the film has a weighted average score of 57 out of 100, based on 38 critics, indicating "mixed or average reviews". Audiences polled by CinemaScore gave the film an average grade of "B" on an A+ to F scale.

One of the main criticisms about Morning Glory was that the film did not provide any substance about television and the media unlike Network (1976) or Broadcast News (1987). Peter Howell of the Toronto Star wrote: "You'll think of Broadcast News and Network watching it, and possibly lament how the film ducks the tough issues of media accountability and culpability that those films dealt with decades ago. (...) Are they [director Roger Michell and screenwriter Aline Brosh McKenna] trying to say anything meaningful about television and the media? If so, they've failed." Stephen Whitty of The Star-Ledger noted that Broadcast News, as opposed to Morning Glory, "was also about something – the conflict between faked telegenic "moments" and hard-news reality (...) And that's what made it not just a fun film but a classic." He concluded: "It's a good enough movie. But it came this close to being great."

The critics who enjoyed Morning Glory pointed out that the film was funny and entertaining. James Berardinelli of ReelViews wrote: "Despite the conventional manner in which the story is resolved, Morning Glory generates enough entertainment, goodwill, and genuine laughs to make it hard to dislike [...] It fits into a shrinking category: the old-fashioned, not-too-raunchy, character-based comedy. It's gentle, unforced and, despite its flaws, likable. It doesn't blaze new trails or astound with its wit but, more likely than not, you'll leave the theater with a smile, and that's certainly worth a recommendation." Andrew O'Hehir of Salon described the film as "a brash, lightweight backstage comedy that looks lovely, doesn't insult its audience and uses its stars, both young and old, to terrific effect." Ty Burr of The Boston Globe wrote: "The movie's a pleasant and occasionally hilarious ride, even if there's a bait-and-switch at its core." Roger Ebert of the Chicago Sun-Times awarded Morning Glory three-and-a-half stars out of four. He stated: "Morning Glory is funny entertainment to begin with, and then Rachel McAdams transforms it. And Harrison Ford transforms himself. (...) This is the kind I like best. It grows from human nature and is about how people do their jobs and live their lives."

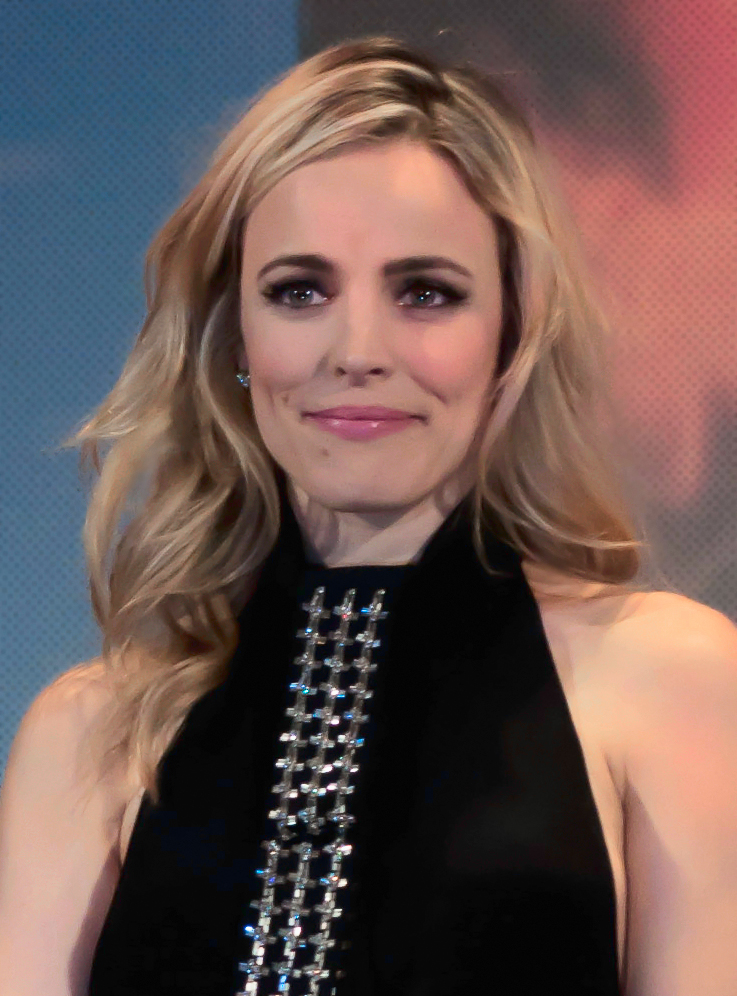
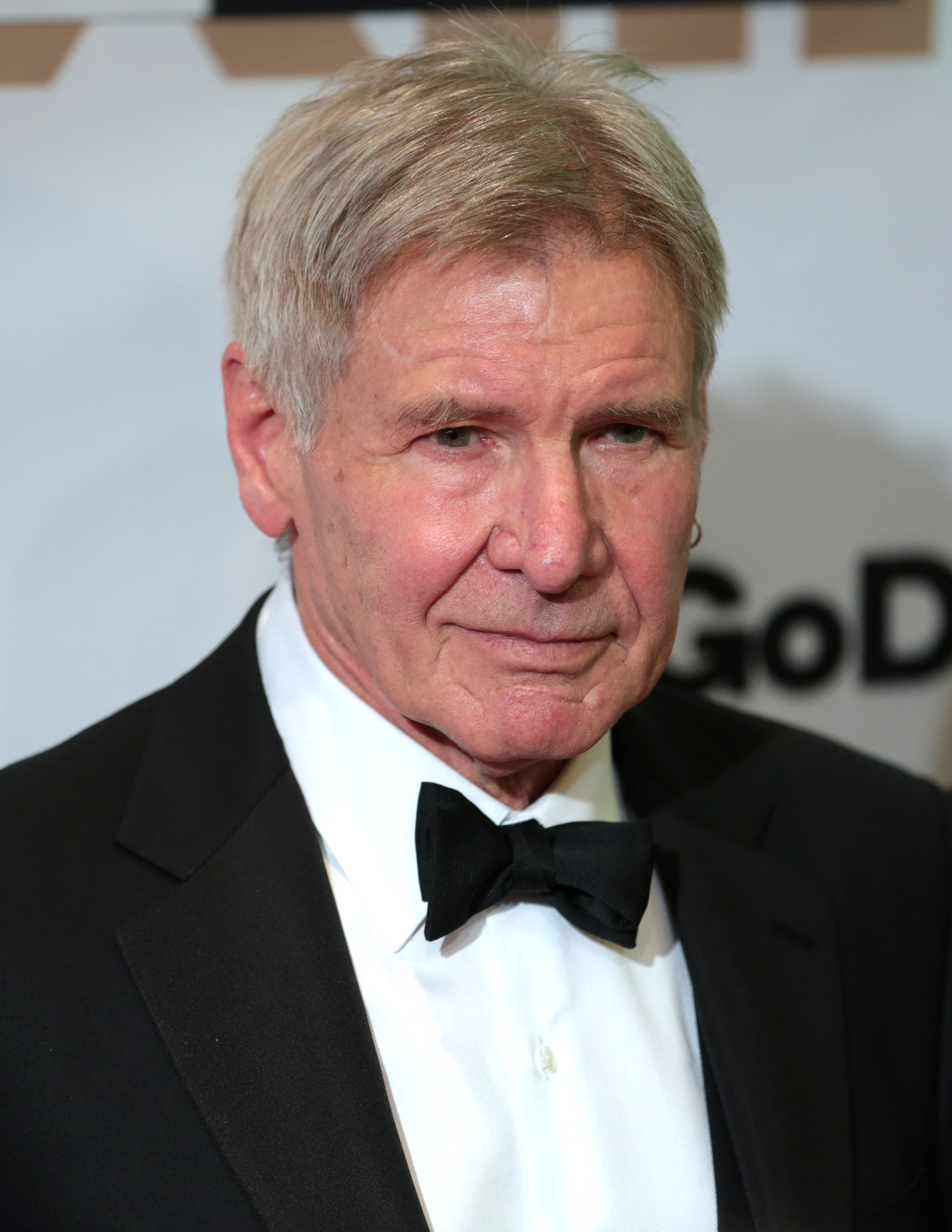
Rachel McAdams and Harrison Ford both received favorable reviews by critics.

Most critics stressed that one of the assets of the film was the performances of its all-star cast. Harrison Ford got strong reviews for his performance in the film. Ebert of the Chicago Sun-Times said: "Ford doesn't venture beyond his usual acting range, but within it, he creates a character with a reluctantly human inside." Peter Travers of Rolling Stone called the film "a tart, terrific comedy that gives Harrison Ford his best and funniest role in years." He added: "The iconic Han Solo and Indiana Jones shows real comic chops as Mike Pomeroy." According to Owen Gleiberman of Entertainment Weekly, "Ford is still a magnetic hunk of a gray-granite movie star, and in Morning Glory, he finds a way to trick up his deadly somber, shifting-quicksand delivery into a shrewd and amusing acting style." Joe Neumaier of the New York Daily News wrote that "Ford is the most casual he's been since Working Girl," while Colin Covert of the Minneapolis Star Tribune stated: "Ford's gravitas and comedic irritability are in perfect balance here." Rex Reed of The New York Observer noted: "All of which gives Harrison Ford a role that fits him like a condom. He gets to be gruff, granite-faced, mean-spirited, rude, and pessimistic, never cracking a smile and scowling like a rat just died in the studio's air-conditioning pipes... The cast is perfect (scowling irascibly like Clifton Webb, Mr. Ford has never been this good)."

Several critics also liked McAdams' performance. Manohla Dargis wrote in The New York Times: "Ms. McAdams plays her role exceptionally well: as the young actress on the verge of the big time, who can win the boy, tame the beast, flash her panties and make you smile without making you cringe, she is a natural." Kenneth Turan of the Los Angeles Times stated: "Though the film's advertising gives the impression that McAdams is one among equals, the reality is that this is her show. (...) she's never carried an entire film as completely and as easily as she does here." Roger Ebert of the Chicago Sun-Times compared Rachel McAdams' performance to Amy Adams' Academy Award-nominated role in Junebug.

Keaton's performance was praised as well. According to ReelViews, "Keaton is so good at her part that one can see her sliding effortlessly into an anchor's chair on a real morning show." Critics said that there was good chemistry between Diane Keaton and Harrison Ford. Peter Travers of Rolling Stone stated: "Keaton and Ford are delicious together." For Rex Reed, "Some of the on-camera bitchery between Ms. Keaton and Mr. Ford is laugh-out-loud witty." However, several critics also felt that Keaton was underused in the film.

In a 2023 interview with James Hibberd of The Hollywood Reporter, Ford reflected on how Morning Glory performed after being asked by Hibberd if he learned something about some of the not-well received films he made during the late 1990s and early 2000s, musing that even if the film "got its money back", he feels like Michell's direction and the performances of McAdams and Keaton could have been enough to make the movie work, as he believes that the film should have worked with all that talent.

=== Accolades ===
Artios Award (Casting Society of America)	Outstanding Achievement in Casting — Comedy	Ellen Lewis	Nominated
Phoenix Film Critics Society Award	Best Original Song	"Strip Me"	Nominated
