= First Love =

First Love may refer to:

== Film and television ==
=== Film ===
- First Love (1921 film), an American silent film by Maurice Campbell
- First Love (1939 film), an American musical by Henry Koster
- First Love (1941 film), an Italian film by Carmine Gallone
- First Love (1959 film), an Italian film by Mario Camerini
- First Love (1970 film), a film by Maximilian Schell
- First Love (1973 film) or Cinta Pertama, an Indonesian film by Teguh Karya
- First Love, a 1974 film by Krzysztof Kieślowski
- First Love (1977 film), an American film by Joan Darling
- First Love (1978 film), an Italian film by Dino Risi
- First Love (2000 film), a Japanese film by Tetsuo Shinohara
- First Love (2004 Italian film), a film by Matteo Garrone and Massimo Gaudioso
- First Love (2004 documentary film), a concert film documenting the Jesus music movement
- First Love (2006 film) or Cinta Pertama, an Indonesian film by Nayato Fio Nuala
- First Love (2010 Nepali film), a film by Simosh Sunuwar
- First Love (2010 Thai film), a film by Puttipong Pormsaka Na-Sakonnakorn and Wasin Pokpong
- First Love (2018 film), a Philippine film by Paul Soriano
- First Love (2019 film), a Japanese film by Takashi Miike
- First Love (2022 film), an American film by A. J. Edwards

=== Television ===
- First Love (1954 TV series), an American soap opera
- First Love (1992 TV series) or Första Kärleken, a Swedish miniseries
- First Love (1996 TV series), a 1996–1997 South Korean television series
- First Love (2004 TV series) or Pierwsza miłość, a Polish soap opera
- First Love (2022 TV series) or First Love Hatsukoi, a Japanese Netflix series
- First Love (2025 TV series), a 2025 South Korean television series

== Literature ==
- First Love (play), a 1795 play by Richard Cumberland
- "First Love", a poem by John Clare
- First Love: A Gothic Tale, a 1996 novella by Joyce Carol Oates
- First Love (Turgenev novella), an 1860 novella by Ivan Turgenev
- "First Love" (short story), a 1946 story by Samuel Beckett
- First Love Illustrated, a 1949–1963 comic book published by Harvey Comics
- "First Love", a short story by Vladimir Nabokov included in the 1968 collection Nabokov's Congeries
- First Love, a 2014 novel by James Patterson with Emily Raymond
- First Love (novel), a 2017 novel by Gwendoline Riley

== Music ==
=== Albums ===
- First Love (After School single album) or the title song, 2013
- First Love (Emmy the Great album) or the title song (see below), 2009
- First Love (Hikaru Utada album) or the title song (see below), 1999
- First Love (Karina Pasian album) or the title song, 2008
- First Love (Lee Hi album), 2013
- First Love (Yiruma album), 2001
- First Love (EP), by CLC, or the title song, 2015
- First Love, by Bryn Terfel, 2008
- First Love, by Julie Vega, or the title song, 1985
- First Love, by Kathleen Battle, 1993
- First Love, by Paul Baloche, 1998

=== Songs ===
- "First Love" (Emmy the Great song), 2009
- "First Love" (Hikaru Utada song), 1999
- "First Love" (Jennifer Lopez song), 2014
- "First Love" (Lost Kings song), 2017
- "First Love" (The Maccabees song), 2006
- "First Love" (Oscar Ortiz and Edgardo Nuñez song), 2023
- "First Love" (Uffie song), 2007
- "First Love", by Adele from 19, 2008
- "First Love", by Billie Piper, B-side of "Something Deep Inside", 2000
- "First Love", by BTS from Wings, 2016
- "First Love", by Dala from Best Day, 2012
- "First Love", by Exo from Love Me Right, 2015
- "First Love", by Kodak Black from Project Baby 2, 2017
- "First Love", by Hillsong Young & Free from III, 2018
- "First Love", by Nikka Costa, 1983
- "First Love", by Stryper from Soldiers Under Command, 1985
- "First Love", by Thelma & James, 2025

== Other uses ==
- First Love, a custom car, winner of the 2007 Ridler Award

== See also ==
- "First Luv", a song by Bini
- Hatsukoi (disambiguation), lit. 'first love' in Japanese
- Tholi Prema (disambiguation) (lit. 'First Love'), various Indian media so titled
