= If This Is It (Newton Faulkner song) =

2009 single by Newton Faulkner

Single by Newton Faulkner

from the album Rebuilt by Humans
- Released: September 11, 2009
- Recorded: 2009
- Genre: Folk rock, art rock
- Length: 4:01
- Label: Ugly Truth
- Songwriter(s): Adam Argyle, Newton Faulkner
- Producer(s): Mike Spencer

Newton Faulkner singles chronology
"Gone in the Morning" (2008)	"If This Is It" (2009)	"Over and Out" (2009)

"If This Is It" is a song by English singer-songwriter and musician Newton Faulkner from his second studio album Rebuilt by Humans (2009). The song was released on September 11, 2009 as the album's lead single. The song was written by Adam Argyle, Newton Faulkner and produced by Mike Spencer. The song peaked to number 56 on the UK Singles Chart and number 29 on the Australian Singles Chart.

== Track listing ==
Digital download EP

1. "If This Is It" – 4:01
2. "I Took It Out On You" (Live from Cheltenham Town Hall) – 3:10
3. "If This Is It" (Live from Cheltenham Town Hall) – 4:13

== Credits and personnel ==
- Lead vocals, acoustic guitar – Newton Faulkner
- Producer – Mike Spencer
- Lyrics – Newton Faulkner, Adam Argyle
- Label: Ugly Truth

== Charts ==
Chart (2009)	Peak position
Australia (ARIA)	29
Scotland (OCC)	63
UK Singles (OCC)	56

== Release history ==
Region	Date	Format	Label
United Kingdom	September 11, 2009	Digital download	RCA Records
