= Gone in the Morning (disambiguation) =

"Gone in the Morning" is a 2008 song by Newton Faulkner.

Gone in the Morning may also refer to:

- "Gone in the Morning", 2014 song by Donae'o and Carnao Beats, remixed by Tough Love
- "Gone in the Morning", 2020 song by Thomas Bergerson from Daybreak
- Gone in the Morning, 1972 album by Quiver
- "Gone in the Morning", unreleased song by Young Buck featuring Trey Songz from Buck the World
