= First Love (Emmy the Great song) =

2009 song by Emmy the Great

Single by Emmy the Great

from the album First Love
- B-side: "Burn Baby Burn"
- Released: 23 February 2009
- Genre: Anti-folk; Lo-fi
- Label: Close Harbour Records
- Songwriter(s): Emmy the Great

Emmy the Great singles chronology
"We Almost Had A Baby" (2008)	"First Love" (2009)	"Iris" (2011)

"First Love" is a song by Emmy the Great, written by Emma-Lee Moss and released as a single in 2009 and on her debut album First Love.

It samples Hallelujah by Leonard Cohen, while the song's story makes reference to the song as the lyrics read, "...from the first time you did rewind that line from "Hallelujah", the original Leonard Cohen version".

Referring to the Leonard Cohen sample, she stated, "That just happened because I had rhymed the word pet with cassette – so I wondered what they'd [the couple in the song] be listening to. Well, everybody's got that song in their house, and just imagine being seduced for the first time and hearing the word Hallelujah." She also explained that this song and every other song she has written had "all come, not by accident, but by extreme interest in crosswords."

Moss covered Burn Baby Burn by Ash, a band who she has expressed admiration for and had previously performed with. The cover was released as a b-side alongside First Love.

== Track listing ==
Digital single

No.	Title	Writer(s)	Sample(s)	Length
1.	"First Love" (edit)	Emma-Lee Moss	* Contains samples of "Hallelujah" by Leonard Cohen	4:38
2.	"Burn Baby Burn" (Ash cover)	Tim Wheeler	* None	3:24
