= Hatsukoi =

Hatsukoi (初恋), a Japanese word that means "first love", may refer to:

== Film ==
- Hatsukoi (2000 film), or First Love, a Japanese film directed by Tetsuo Shinohara
- Hatsukoi (2019 film), or First Love, a Japanese film directed by Takashi Miike
- Hatsukoi, a 2006 Japanese film starring Aoi Miyazaki
- Hatsukoi, a 2009 Japanese film starring Hanako

== Music ==
=== Albums ===
- Hatsukoi (Hikaru Utada album) or the title song (see below), 2018
- Hatsukoi (Kōzō Murashita album) or the title song, 1983
- Hatsukoi (Space Streakings album), 1993

=== Songs ===
- "Hatsukoi" (Hikaru Utada song), 2018
- "Hatsukoi" (Masaharu Fukuyama song), 2009
- "Hatsukoi" (Yuki Saito song), 1985
- "Hatsukoi", by Aiko, 2001
- "Hatsukoi", by Hanako Oku, 2010
- "Hatsukoi", by Hitomi Yaida from It's a New Day, 2006
- "Hatsukoi", by Mayumi Kojima, 1997

== See also ==
- First Love (disambiguation)
