= Edward (EP) =

EP by Emmy the Great
- Released: 10 August 2009
- Genre: Anti-folk
- Length: 15:57
- Label: Close Harbour Records
- Producer: Adam Beach

Professional ratings
Review scores
Source	Rating
Drowned in Sound	8/10 link

Edward is an EP by the London singer-songwriter Emma-Lee Moss, better known as Emmy the Great, released on 10 August 2009 on the UK indie label Close Harbour Records. It is a collection of songs written before the release of her first album, First Love, but not recorded in the album sessions. Moss wrote on her MySpace page that after playing these songs on tour, she was reminded of the joys of songwriting, and inspired to record the songs for a spontaneous release.

== Critical reception ==
The EP was released with a copy of a short story written by Moss, entitled "The Wet and Windy Moors". and was generally well-received on release. Paul Brown, on the website Drowned in Sound, praised it as showing "examples of Emmy's ability to interweave poignancy with knowing wit", and considered it a fitting way to round off before the beginning of recording of Moss's second album.

== Track listing ==
1. "Edward is Dedward" - 3:51
2. "A Bowl Collecting Blood" - 3:45
3. "Two Steps Forward" - 4:34
4. "Canopies and Drapes" - 3:45
