= Strip Me (disambiguation) =

Strip Me is the third studio album by British singer-songwriter Natasha Bedingfield

Strip Me may also refer to:

- Strip Me?, album by Anna Tsuchiya
- Strip Me (song), a song by Natasha Bedingfield
- "Strip Me", song by Suzi Quatro from 1975 album Your Mamma Won't Like Me
