= I Hate Mondays =

I Hate Mondays may refer to:

- "I Hate Mondays" (song), a 2009 song by Newton Faulkner
- I Hate Mondays (film), a 1971 Polish film
- "I Hate Mondays", a 1991 episode of Dark Justice
- A quote commonly associated with Garfield, a character from the comic of the same name.

== See also ==
- "I Don't Like Mondays", a 1979 song by The Boomtown Rats
