= Tholi Prema =

Tholi Prema (lit. 'first love' in Telugu) may refer to:

- Tholi Prema (1998 film), an Indian film
- Tholi Prema (2018 film), an Indian film

== See also ==
- First Love (disambiguation)
