= Clouds (Newton Faulkner song) =

Single by Newton Faulkner

from the album Write It On Your Skin
- Released: 29 June 2012
- Recorded: 2011
- Genre: Folk pop
- Length: 3:17
- Label: RCA Records
- Songwriter(s): Sam Farrar, Newton Faulkner, Toby Faulkner
- Producer(s): Sam Farrar, Newton Faulkner, Mike Spencer

Newton Faulkner singles chronology
"Write It On Your Skin" (2012)	"Clouds" (2012)

"Clouds" is a song by English singer-songwriter and musician Newton Faulkner from his third studio album Write It On Your Skin (2012). The song was released on 29 June 2012 in the UK as the second single from the album. The song peaked to number 68 on the UK Singles Chart. The song was written by Sam Farrar, Newton Faulkner and Toby Faulkner.

== Track listing ==
Digital download

1. "Clouds" – 3:17
2. "Crocodile Smile" – 2:50

== Credits and personnel ==
- Lead vocals – Newton Faulkner
- Producers – Sam Farrar, Newton Faulkner, Mike Spencer
- Lyrics – Sam Farrar, Newton Faulkner, Toby Faulkner
- Label: RCA Records

== Chart performance ==
Chart (2012)	Peak position
UK Singles (Official Charts Company)	68

== Release history ==
Region	Date	Format	Label
United Kingdom	20 May 2012	Digital download	RCA Records
