= Human Love =

Studio album by Newton Faulkner
- Released: 20 November 2015
- Recorded: 2015
- Genre: Folk rock, pop rock, indie rock
- Length: 37:48
- Label: BMG

Newton Faulkner chronology
Studio Zoo (2013)	Human Love (2015)	Hit the Ground Running (2017)

Singles from Human Love
- 1. "Get Free" Released: 27 November 2015

Human Love is the fifth studio album by British singer-songwriter Newton Faulkner. It was released on 20 November 2015 through BMG.

== Promotion ==
The album was promoted by a cover of Major Lazer's song "Get Free", which was released as the lead single on 27 November 2015. A music video for the song, in which Faulkner cuts off his trademark dreadlocks to mark a beginning of a new chapter in his career, was released on 15 September 2015.

== Critical reception ==
Professional ratings
Review scores
Source	Rating
Audio Addict	9/10
London Evening Standard	3/5 stars
Renowned for Sound	5/5 stars
Música Nueva	3/5 stars

Writing for Renowned for Sound, Brandon Veevers awarded Human Love five out of five stars and commented that the album was "easily [Faulkner's] finest work since his debut album," Hand Built by Robots (2007). "Human Love showcases Faulkner as a gifted guitarist, a versatile performer and a truly sublime vocalist with an unrivaled songwriting talent. Moving effortlessly between somber ballads like the minimalist 'Break' and the eclectic and quirky 'Can I Be Enough' through to world-scented toe tappers like 'Up Up and Away' and 'Far to Fall', Faulkner has raised the bar yet again and delivered a truly exceptional collection."

In a mixed review for the London Evening Standard, Andre Paine noted that "Faulkner emerged as a rootsy songwriter ... and that energy is intact on the clattering 'Up Up and Away', the blues-pop of 'Stay and Take' and the world music rhythms of 'Far to Fall'," however, the albums was "polished but occasionally forgettable."

== Track listing ==
All tracks are written by Newton Faulkner, except where noted

No.	Title	Writer(s)	Length
1.	"Get Free"	Thomas Wesley Pentz; David James Andrew Taylor; David Longstreth; Amber Coffman	3:33
2.	"Up Up and Away"		3:34
3.	"Step in the Right Direction"		3:09
4.	"Passing Planes"		3:26
5.	"Stay and Take" (featuring Tessa Rose Jackson)		3:11
6.	"Break"		4:03
7.	"Far to Fall"	Ed Drewett; Dan Dare; Faulkner	3:07
8.	"Can I Be Enough"		3:42
9.	"Gone"		2:28
10.	"Shadow Boxing"		3:55
11.	"Human Love"		3:40

Deluxe edition bonus tracks
No.	Title	Length
12.	"Get Free" (Acoustic)	3:23
13.	"Human Love" (Acoustic)	3:47
14.	"Gone" (Acoustic)	2:53
15.	"Far to Fall" (Acoustic)	3:19
16.	"Step in the Right Direction" (Acoustic)	3:28

== Personnel ==
- Newton Faulkner – lead vocals, guitar
- Tessa Rose Jackson – vocals (track 5)

Technical personnel

- Cenzo Townshend – mixing
- Cam Blackwood – production (track 3)
- Empire of the Sun – production (track 10)

== Charts ==
Chart (2015)	Peak position
Irish Albums (IRMA)	82
UK Albums (OCC)	41
