= Write It on Your Skin (song) =

Single by Newton Faulkner

from the album Write It on Your Skin
- Released: 20 May 2012
- Recorded: 2011
- Genre: Alternative
- Length: 3:14
- Label: RCA Records
- Songwriter(s): Newton Faulkner
- Producer(s): Newton Faulkner

Newton Faulkner singles chronology
"I Hate Mondays" (2010)	"Write It on Your Skin" (2012)	"Clouds" (2012)

"Write It on Your Skin" is a song by English singer-songwriter and musician Newton Faulkner from his third studio album of the same name. The song was released on 20 May 2012 in the UK as the lead single from the album. The song peaked to number 54 on the UK Singles Chart. The song was written and produced by Newton Faulkner.

== Track listing ==
Digital download

1. "Write It on Your Skin" – 3:14

== Credits and personnel ==
- Lead vocals – Newton Faulkner
- Producers – Newton Faulkner
- Lyrics – Newton Faulkner
- Label: RCA Records

== Chart performance ==
Chart (2012)	Peak position
UK Singles (Official Charts Company)	54

== Release history ==
Region	Date	Format	Label
United Kingdom	20 May 2012	Digital download	RCA Records
