= Touch (Natasha Bedingfield song) =

2010 album by Natasha Bedingfield

Single by Natasha Bedingfield

from the album Strip Me
- Released: 18 May 2010
- Recorded: Enemy Dojo (Calabasas)
- Genre: Dance-pop; R&B
- Length: 3:46
- Label: Epic
- Songwriters: Natasha Bedingfield; Julian Bunetta; Steve Kipner
- Producers: Bunetta; Kipner

Natasha Bedingfield singles chronology
"Soulmate" (2008)	"Touch" (2010)	"Strip Me" (2010)

Music video
- "Touch" on YouTube

"Touch" is a song performed by British singer-songwriter Natasha Bedingfield. The song written by Bedingfield, Julian Bunetta, and Steve Kipner was released to the US iTunes Store on 18 May 2010 as the lead single from her third studio album, Strip Me, which came out in late 2010. The song was sent to US radio on 29 June 2010 and then later confirmed to be a trailer single, whilst the album's title track serves as the first official single.

== Critical reception ==
Becky Bain of 'Idolator' liked the song saying "it won her over". She said "The verses seem a bit rambling (Natasha basically runs through every errand she did that day), but the catchy chorus of 'we danced, and we laughed, and we touched' wins us over. And we’re fairly certain it will inevitably be played on our TVs ad nauseam during iPod Touch commercials."

== Music video ==
Rich Lee was booked to direct the video which was filmed in the first week of July 2010. Lee is best known for his work with The Black Eyed Peas. 13 July, outtakes from the video were released on Bedingfield's official site and YouTube account. The video was released to the singer's official Vevo account on 27 July 2010.

== Promotion ==
It has been revealed that "Touch" will be used as the theme song for an upcoming NIVEA skincare campaign. Of the partnership which will involved the song being featured in TV commercials Bedingfield said "I've never been happier than I am right now ... I just celebrated my one-year wedding anniversary with the love of my life, and my new album, which I'm very proud of, will be released this fall. When I heard about NIVEA's Happiness campaign, I couldn't think of a better way to share my new song, 'Touch,' with fans. When you feel happy, it's contagious!" Bedingfield performed the song live for the first time on The Ellen DeGeneres Show on 24 May 2010. She performed the song for a second time on So You Think You Can Dance on 8 July 2010. On 19 July, Bedingfield performed the song at the VH1 Do Something Awards.

== Remix ==
"Touch" was officially remixed by The Dirty Tees. The remix was released in December 2010.

== Charts ==
Chart (2010)	Peak position
Canada (Canadian Hot 100)	60

== Release history ==
=== Radio adds ===
Region	Date	Format
United States	29 June 2010	Mainstream

=== Release ===
Region	Date	Format	Label
Canada	18 May 2010	Digital download	Sony Music
United States	18 May 2010	Digital download	Epic
