= Gone in the Morning =

Single by Newton Faulkner

from the album Hand Built by Robots
- Released: 19 June 2008
- Recorded: 2006–2007
- Studio: The Barn, Vermont; Peermusic, London
- Genre: Folk-pop
- Length: 2:32
- Label: Ugly Truth
- Songwriters: Newton Faulkner; Toby Faulkner
- Producer: Andy McKim

Newton Faulkner singles chronology
"I Need Something" (2008)	"Gone in the Morning" (2008)	"If This Is It" (2009)

Music video
- Official music video on YouTube

"Gone in the Morning" is a song by English singer-songwriter and musician Newton Faulkner, released on 19 June 2008, as the fifth and final single from his debut studio album Hand Built by Robots (2007).

Written by Faulkner alongside his brother, Toby, and produced by Andy McKim, "Gone in the Morning" peaked at number 83 on the UK Singles Chart.

== Composition ==
The song is about dreaming and the frustration that occurs when one forgets what they dreamt about.

== Critical reception ==
Writing for Paisley Tunes, Shuaibaj dubbed "Gone in the Morning" the "one track" from Faulkner's discography "worth it's airplay". He went on to call it a "fun, uncomplicated tune that has the likable qualities necessary for success" that can be "play[ed] anytime, anywhere".

== Live performances ==
"Gone in the Morning" is a fan favourite song, and Faulkner continues to play the song during live performances.

== Track listing ==
"Gone in the Morning" digital download and CD single track listing
No.	Title	Writer(s)	Producer(s)	Length
1.	"Gone in the Morning" (single version)	Newton Faulkner; Toby Faulkner	Andy McKim	2:32
Total length:				2:32

== Credits and personnel ==
Adapted from the parent album's liner notes.

- Newton Faulkner – vocals, writing
- Toby Faulkner – writing
- Andy McKim – record production

== Chart performance ==
"Gone in the Morning" weekly chart performance
Chart (2008)	Peak position
UK Singles (Official Charts)	83

== Release history ==
"Gone in the Morning" release history and formats
Region	Date	Format(s)	Label	Ref.
United Kingdom	19 June 2008	Digital download	Ugly Truth	
Various	19 June 2008	CD single	Ugly Truth	
