= Eric Roche =

Irish fingerstyle guitarist (1967–2005)

Background information
- Born: 4 December 1967; New York City, USA
- Origin: Tralee, County Kerry, Ireland
- Died: 6 September 2005 (aged 37)
- Genres: Fingerstyle
- Instrument: Guitar
- Years active: 1990s–2000s
- Label: P3 Music
- Website: www.ericroche.com

Eric Roche (4 December 1967 – 6 September 2005) was an Irish fingerstyle guitarist.

== Biography ==
Roche was born in New York City, after which his family moved to Tralee, County Kerry, Ireland. He was an accountant, but practised only for a short time before enlisting for classical guitar at the London Musician's Institute in 1992. After his degree he became head of its guitar department in 1996 and released his first CD The Perc U Lator three years later. In 2000 he became head of guitar at Academy of Contemporary Music in Guildford, where his pupils included Newton Faulkner. In 2001 his second CD Spin was released. In 2004 Roche issued his third album With These Hands and released his book The Acoustic Guitar Bible, a guide to acoustic guitar playing with a foreword by Tommy Emmanuel. Roche was a regular columnist for the magazines Guitar Techniques and Acoustic Guitar and did international master classes and workshops.

Eric played many musical genres on solo guitar such as classical, Celtic, Folk, jazz, blues, rock and pop. As well as being a gifted guitarist-composer, he was also well known for his solo guitar arrangements of other artists' tunes. Some of these solo arrangements include:

- "Jump" by Van Halen
- "Higher Ground" by Stevie Wonder
- "Killer" by Seal
- "Blue in Green" by Miles Davis
- "She Drives Me Crazy" by the Fine Young Cannibals
- "Norwegian Wood (This Bird Has Flown)" and "While My Guitar Gently Weeps" by The Beatles
- "Take Five" by Dave Brubeck
- "Smells Like Teen Spirit" by Nirvana

A characteristic feature of his playing was his percussive style of playing involving drumming on the body of the guitar to create the sound of various different drums and sounds similar to DJ scratching. He was well versed in not only standard tuning, but also in various other altered tunings on guitar, especially DADGAD. Just like Pierre Bensusan and Laurence Juber, Roche was able to play in multiple keys on this tuning without the need for a capo.

== Death ==
Roche died from throat cancer aged 37 and left his wife Candy and his two children, Stefanos and Francesca.

For Eric, a tribute CD, was released shortly after his death in 2005, containing 20 tracks from different artists. In 2006, the Guitar School of the Academy of Contemporary Music in Guildford was renamed to "ACM Eric Roche Guitar School". Guthrie Govan dedicated a song called "Eric" in his 2006 album Erotic Cakes to him. Newton Faulkner's song 'So Much' was written as a token of respect for the influence Roche had had in his life. In 2006 Roche's Tablature Collection #1 was published, jointly produced by Roche and his close friend Thomas Leeb, who dedicated his work to Roche and his part of possible income to the benefit of Roche's children.YouTube guitarist, 'Robert Castellani', wrote a song in tribute to Roche entitled, 'Song for Eric'.

A radio documentary on Roche's life, featuring his brother Bryan, was broadcast on the Irish station RTÉ in February 2009.

== Discography ==
- The Perc U Lator - 1999 (Inner Ear Music)
- Acoustic Avalon (live compilation) - 1999 (Inner Ear Music)
- Spin - 2001 (Inner Ear Music)
- Eric Roche in concert at The Electric Theatre (DVD) - 2003 (Inner Ear Music)
- With These Hands - 2004 (P3 Music)
- Live + Inspirational (posthumous) - 2006 (P3 Music)

== Books and sheet music ==
- Ballads for Classical Guitar - 1998 (Wise Publications), ISBN 0-7119-7175-7
- The Acoustic Guitar Bible - 2004 (SMT/Bobcat Books Ltd.), 243 p., ISBN 1-84492-063-1
- Eric Roche Tablature Collection #1 - 2006 (Sheehans Music)
