= Aiko discography =

- Studio albums: 17
- Live albums: 8
- Compilation albums: 3
- Singles: 40

This is the discography of Japanese singer and songwriter Aiko. All of Aiko's songs are distributed by Japanese media company Pony Canyon.

== Albums ==
=== Studio albums ===
List of studio albums, with selected chart positions, sales and certifications
Title	Album details	Peak positions	Sales (JPN)	Certifications
Title	Album details	JPN	Sales (JPN)	Certifications
Chiisa na Marui Kōjitsu (小さな丸い好日; Little Calm Good Day)	Release: April 21, 1999; Label: Pony Canyon; Formats: CD, digital download	31	138,000	
Sakura no Ki no Shita (桜の木の下; Under the Cherry Blossom Tree)	Release: March 31, 2000; Label: Pony Canyon; Formats: CD, digital download	1	1,418,000	RIAJ: 4× Platinum
Natsufuku (夏服; Summer Clothing)	Release: June 20, 2001; Label: Pony Canyon; Formats: CD, digital download	1	987,000	RIAJ: Million
Aki Soba ni Iru yo (秋 そばにいるよ; Autumn Is Beside Me)	Release: September 4, 2002; Label: Pony Canyon; Formats: CD, digital download	2	506,000	RIAJ: Platinum
Akatsuki no Love Letter (暁のラブレター; Love Letter of Daybreak)	Release: November 27, 2003; Label: Pony Canyon; Formats: CD, digital download	1	523,000	RIAJ: 2× Platinum
Yume no Naka no Massugu na Michi (夢の中のまっすぐな道; The Straight Ahead Path in a Dream)	Release: March 2, 2005; Label: Pony Canyon; Formats: CD, digital download	1	474,000	RIAJ: 2× Platinum
Kanojo (彼女; Girlfriend)	Release: August 23, 2006; Label: Pony Canyon; Formats: CD, digital download	1	462,000	RIAJ: 2× Platinum
Himitsu (秘密; Secret)	Release: April 2, 2008; Label: Pony Canyon; Formats: CD, digital download	2	263,000	RIAJ: Platinum
Baby	Release: December 16, 2009; Label: Pony Canyon; Formats: CD, digital download	1	208,000	RIAJ: Platinum
Toki no Silhouette (時のシルエット; Silhouette of Time)	Release: June 20, 2012; Label: Pony Canyon; Formats: CD, digital download,	1	148,000	RIAJ: Gold
Awa no You na Ai Datta (泡のような愛だった; It Was a Love Like Foam)	Release: May 28, 2014; Label: Pony Canyon; Formats: CD, digital download	1	117,000	RIAJ: Gold
May Dream	Release: May 18, 2016; Label: Pony Canyon; Formats: CD, CD/DVD, CD/Blu-ray, digital download	1	96,000	RIAJ: Gold
Shimetta Natsu no Hajimari (湿った夏の始まり; Beginning of a Humid Summer)	Release: June 6, 2018; Label: Pony Canyon; Formats: CD, digital download	3	63,000	
Dōshitatte Tsutaerarenai Kara (どうしたって伝えられないから; I Can't Tell You Why)	Release: March 3, 2021; Label: Pony Canyon; Formats: CD, CD/DVD, CD/Blu-ray, digital download	2		
Ima no Futari o Otagai ga Miteru (今の二人をお互いが見てる; The Two of Us Are Looking at Each Other Now)	Release: March 29, 2023; Label: Pony Canyon; Formats: CD, digital download	1	30,210	
Zan Kokoro Zansho (残心残暑; Late Summer Heat)	Release: August 28, 2024; Label: Pony Canyon; Formats: CD, digital download	5	32,361	
Saigo ni Atsui Hibi o Kuruwashiki Omoi de (最後に熱い日々を狂わしき想いで; With Mad Thoughts of Those Last Passionate Days)	Release: October 21, 2026; Label: Pony Canyon; Formats: CD, digital download	3	26,113	

=== Compilation albums ===
List of compilation albums, with selected details, chart positions, sales and certifications
Title	Album details	Peak positions	Sales (JPN)	Certifications
Title	Album details	JPN	Sales (JPN)	Certifications
Matome I (まとめI; Conclusion I)	Release: February 23, 2011; Label: Pony Canyon; Formats: CD, digital download	2	380,000	RIAJ: Platinum
Matome II (まとめII; Conclusion II)	Release: February 23, 2011; Label: Pony Canyon; Formats: CD, digital download	3	342,000	RIAJ: Platinum
Aiko no Uta. (aikoの詩。; aiko's Songs)	Release: June 5, 2019; Label: Pony Canyon; Formats: 4CD, 4CD+DVD	1	89,195	

=== Independent albums ===
Release date	Title	Notes
August 1996	Doty Omnibus CD Vol.1 (ドーテイオムニバスCD Vol.1)	Various artists album (participated in 3 songs)
December 20, 1997	Astral Box	Mini album
May 30, 1998	Girlie	Mini album

== Singles ==
Title	Year	Peak chart positions		Sales (JPN)	Certifications	Album
Title	Year	Oricon	Japan Hot 100	Sales (JPN)	Certifications	Album
"Hachimitsu" (ハチミツ; Honey)	1998	—	—			Girlie
"Ashita" (あした; "Tomorrow")	1998	16	—	30,000		Chiisa na Marui Koujitsu
"Naki Mushi" (ナキ・ムシ; "Crybaby")	1999	26	—	57,000		Chiisa na Marui Koujitsu
"Hanabi" (花火; "Fireworks")	1999	10	—	213,000	RIAJ (physical): Gold; RIAJ (streaming): 2× Platinum	Sakura no Ki no Shita
"Kabutomushi" (カブトムシ; "Beetle")	1999	8	—	242,000	RIAJ (physical): Gold; RIAJ (digital): Gold; RIAJ (streaming): 2× Platinum	Sakura no Ki no Shita
"Sakura no Toki" (桜の時; "Cherry Blossom Time")	2000	12	—	134,000		Sakura no Ki no Shita
"Boyfriend" (ボーイフレンド)	2000	2	—	521,000	RIAJ (physical): Platinum; RIAJ (streaming): Platinum	Natsufuku
"Hatsukoi" (初恋; "First Love")	2001	3	—	322,000	RIAJ (physical): Platinum	Natsufuku
"Rosie" (ロージー)	2001	2	—	146,000	RIAJ (physical): Gold	Natsufuku
"Oyasuminasai" (おやすみなさい; "Good Night")	2001	2	—	162,000	RIAJ (physical): Gold	Aki Soba ni Iru yo
"Anata to Akushu" (あなたと握手; "I Shake Hands With You")	2002	6	—	102,000	RIAJ (physical): Gold	Aki Soba ni Iru yo
"Kondo Made ni wa" (今度までには; "By This Time")	2002	3	—	90,000		Aki Soba ni Iru yo
"Chouchou Musubi" (蝶々結び; "Butterfly Knot")	2003	4	—	121,000	RIAJ (physical): Gold	Akatsuki no Love Letter
"Andromeda" (アンドロメダ)	2003	3	—	136,000	RIAJ (physical): Gold	Akatsuki no Love Letter
"Eriashi" (えりあし; "Nape")	2003	5	—	91,000	RIAJ (physical): Gold	Akatsuki no Love Letter
"Kaban" (かばん; "Bag")	2004	3	—	97,000	RIAJ (physical): Gold	Yume no Naka no Massugu na Michi
"Hana Kaze" (花風; "Flowers in the Wind")	2004	2	—	117,000	RIAJ (physical): Gold	Yume no Naka no Massugu na Michi
"Mikuni Eki" (三国駅; "Mikuni Station")	2005	2	—	93,000	RIAJ (physical): Gold	Yume no Naka no Massugu na Michi
"Kirakira" (キラキラ; "Sparkle")	2005	2	—	210,000	RIAJ (physical): Platinum; RIAJ (streaming): Gold	Kanojo
"Star" ("スター")	2005	4	—	111,000	RIAJ (physical): Gold	Kanojo
"Kumo wa Shiro Ringo wa Aka" (雲は白リンゴは赤; "Clouds are White, Apples are Red")	2006	3	—	89,000	RIAJ (physical): Gold	Kanojo
"Shiawase" (シアワセ; "Happiness")	2007	2	—	96,000	RIAJ (physical): Gold	Himitsu
"Hoshi no Nai Sekai" (星のない世界; "World Without Stars")	2007	2	—	112,000	RIAJ (physical): Gold	Himitsu
"Yokogao" (横顔; "Face in Profile")	2007	2	—	112,000	RIAJ (physical): Gold; RIAJ (digital): Gold	Himitsu
"Futari" (二人; "Two People")	2008	3	4	82,000	RIAJ (physical): Gold	Himitsu
"KissHug"	2008	2	2	107,000	RIAJ (physical): Gold; RIAJ (streaming): Platinum	Baby
"Milk"	2009	1	1	102,000	RIAJ (physical): Gold	Baby
"Nageki no Kiss" (嘆きのキス; "Kiss of Grief")	2009	1	57	102,000	RIAJ (physical): Gold	Baby
"Modorenai Ashita" (戻れない明日; "Tomorrow That Won't Go Back")	2010	1	1	75,000	RIAJ (physical): Gold	Baby
"Mukaiawase" (向かいあわせ; "Face to Face")	2010	2	2	68,000		Toki no Silhouette
"Koi no Super Ball" (恋のスーパーボール; "Super Ball of Love")	2011	4	4	97,000		Toki no Silhouette
"Form" (ホーム; "Train Platform")	2011	4	12	97,000		Toki no Silhouette
"Zutto" (ずっと; "Always")	2011	4	3	64,000		Toki no Silhouette
"Loveletter"	2013	2	2	60,000		Awa no You na Ai Datta
"4gatsu no Ame" (4月の雨; "April Rain")	2013	2	38	60,000		Awa no You na Ai Datta
"Kimi no Tonari" (君の隣; "Beside You")	2014	5	3	45,000		Awa no You na Ai Datta
"Atashi no Mukou" (あたしの向こう; "Beyond Myself")	2014	4	5	52,000		May Dream
"Yumemiru Sukima" (夢見る隙間; "Dreaming Gap")	2015	7	7	51,000		May Dream
"Puramai" (プラマイ; "Plus Minus")	2015	5	4	35,000		May Dream
"Motto" (もっと; "More")	2016	3	2	42,000	RIAJ (digital): Gold	May Dream
"Koi wo Shita no wa" (恋をしたのは; "I Was In Love")	2016	3	4	34,000		Shimetta Natsu no Hajimari
"Yokoku" (予告; "Notice")	2017	3	4	31,000		Shimetta Natsu no Hajimari
"Straw" (ストロー)	2018	6	6	27,000	RIAJ (streaming): Gold	Shimetta Natsu no Hajimari
"Aozora" (青空; "Blue Sky")	2020	6	6	22,197		Doushitatte Tsutaerarenaikara
“Honey Memory” ( ハニーメモリー)	2020	3	3	20,340		Doushitatte Tsutaerarenaikara
"Negau Yoru" (ねがう夜; "Wishing Night")	2022	4	17	19,745		Ima no Futari o Otagai ga Miteru
"Hateshinai Futari" (果てしない二人)	2022	4	27	14,078		Ima no Futari o Otagai ga Miteru
"Akatoki Reload" (あかときリロード)	2023	—	69			Ima no Futari o Otagai ga Miteru
"Areta Kuchibiru wa Koi o Nakusu" (荒れた唇は恋を失くす)	2023	—	49			Ima no Futari o Otagai ga Miteru
"Radio" (ラジオ)	2023	—	87			Non-album single
"Hoshi no Furu Hi ni" (星の降る日に)	2023	5	21	16,939		Hoshi no Furu Hi ni
"Mutual Love" (相思相愛)	2024	5	7	18,851	RIAJ: (streaming): Platinum	Non-album singles
"Cinema" / "Capsule" (シネマ/カプセル)	2025	5	—	14,494		Non-album singles
"Cry High Fly"	2026	3	33	15,203		Non-album singles
"Anata no Hana no Iro" (あなたの花の色)	2026	—	49			TBA
"—" denotes releases that did not chart
