= Studio Zoo =

Studio album by Newton Faulkner
- Released: 26 August 2013
- Recorded: June–July 2013
- Studios: Faulkner's home studio, London
- Genres: Folk rock, pop rock
- Label: Ugly Truth/RCA
- Producer: Newton Faulkner

Newton Faulkner chronology
Write It on Your Skin (2012)	Studio Zoo (2013)	Human Love (2015)

Singles from Studio Zoo
- 1. "Losing Ground" Released: 8 September 2013

Studio Zoo is the fourth studio album by British singer-songwriter Newton Faulkner, and the first album he has produced himself. Its recording, which took place in June and July 2013 at Faulkner's home, was streamed live online. The album was released on 26 August 2013.

== Recording ==
The recording of Studio Zoo was being streamed live online, 24/7 for 5 weeks from 11 June 2013. His home studio in East London was set up with 4 cameras, to allow fans to follow every detail of recording the album – with no producer or engineer, only Faulkner and a few guests, such as The X Factor's Janet Devlin and Ted Dwane (of Mumford & Sons). Fans were also able to follow regular updates on the social networks, such as Facebook and Twitter. The campaign used the hashtag #StudioZoo which allowed users tweets to play sounds in Faulkner's house. The campaign concluded in a party at Faulkner's house with a set jungle. There was a toy jeep which would drive forward every time someone tweeted #StudioZoo. The #StudioZoo campaign was created and ran by Powster.

"I am as excited as I am terrified by the prospect of having a house full of cameras film me while trying to record an album. The entire recording process will be streamed live and nothing has been recorded in advance – apart from some particularly good hand claps recorded in Paris. The album will be made before your very eyes, no tricks, no producer and no engineer, just me, a guitar and a few surprise guests," said Faulkner.

"With the whole album I gave myself relatively strict rules. The main criticism I’ve had in the past has been that my recordings have been overly layered and polished. So as this is the first album I’ve ever produced myself, I aimed to make sure this wasn’t the case. I limited myself to one guitar part per track, which meant I pushed my playing considerably further than ever before. I also tried to harmonise with myself as little as possible vocally," he said in an interview with The Independent. "So that the main guitar part and lead vocal had to carry every track the way it does when I play live. I did allow myself to get in great players and singers to add more light and shade. Andreya Trianna and Janet Devlin both did awesome harmonies and guitar-wise I was joined by some of best acoustic guitarists in the world, Thomas Leeb and Nick Harper. Ted Dwane from Mumford and Sons played some double bass and India Borne, who plays cello and bunch of stuff for Ben Howard, popped in too. I was very lucky."

== Promotion ==
The lead single to promote the album, "Losing Ground", was released on 8 September 2013. Faulkner said that the song "is about battling on even when you know you're on the back foot. You go through ups and downs and it's about being in a down but being ok with it, because you know there must be an up on the way... hopefully." A music video for the song, created by London-based motion graphics company Powster, was released onto YouTube on 21 August 2013.

== Reception ==
Professional ratings
Review scores
Source	Rating
The Guardian	3/5 stars
The Scotsman	2/5 stars

=== Critical reception ===
Caroline Sullivan of The Guardian gave the album three out of five stars, and commented that Faulkner, whose calling card is laidback amiability, should start playing against type and "rather than swaddling every song in layers of delicately picked guitar, he should have found his inner wildebeest and let it roar." She added that he seems to be apologising for his very existence, and "had he stopped burying the emotions under passive-aggressive sweetness and let his voice ratchet up a few notches, this could have been an interesting album."

=== Commercial performance ===
Commercially, Studio Zoo has been less successful than Falkner's previous albums. On the UK Albums Chart, it debuted at number 10, and peaked at number 51 on the Irish Albums Chart.

== Track listing ==
Writing credits from AllMusic.

All tracks are written by Newton Faulkner and Toby Faulkner, except where noted.

No.	Title	Writer(s)	Length
1.	"Where to Start"		3:09
2.	"Treading Water"		4:32
3.	"Plastic Hearts"	Sam Brookes, Dan Dare, Newton Faulkner, Toby Faulkner	2:56
4.	"Indecisive"	Newton Faulkner, Josh Wilkinson	3:56
5.	"Just Outside"		3:41
6.	"Losing Ground"		3:06
7.	"At the Seams"	John Beck, Steve Chrisanthou, Newton Faulkner	4:40
8.	"In My Head"		2:11
9.	"Don't Make Me Go There"	Newton Faulkner	4:00
10.	"Lay Down"		4:12
11.	"Waiting on You"		3:55
12.	"Innocent"		3:58
13.	"Orange Skies"		3:51

Deluxe Edition bonus tracks
No.	Title	Length
14.	"Possessed"	4:19
15.	"Keep Trying"	3:49
16.	"Can't Give It Away"	3:05
17.	"Plastic Hearts" (instrumental version)	2:59

iTunes bonus track
No.	Title	Length
18.	"He Was a Professional"	3:07

== Personnel ==
Musicians

- Newton Faulkner – lead vocals, guitar, bass guitar, piano, guitarrón, mandolin, banjo, guzheng
- Nick Harper – guitar, backing vocals
- Thomas Leeb – guitar
- India Bourne – cello
- Ted Dwane – double bass, backing vocals
- Toby Faulkner – backing vocals
- Andreya Triana – backing vocals
- Janet Devlin – backing vocals
- Sam Brookes – backing vocals
- Dan Dare – backing vocals
- Random Impulse – backing vocals
- Ryan Keen – backing vocals
- Nikki Lamborn – backing vocals
- Anna Baines – backing vocals

Technical personnel

- Newton Faulkner – production, engineering
- Andy Parker – mixing (tracks 1, 4, 7, 9, 11–13)
- Ben Phillips – mixing (tracks 2, 3, 5, 6, 8 and 10)
- John Davis – mastering
- Emily Coxhead – photography, design

== Charts ==
Charts (2013)	Peak position
Ireland (Irish Albums Chart)	51
United Kingdom (UK Albums Chart)	10
