= Emmy the Great =

English singer-songwriter

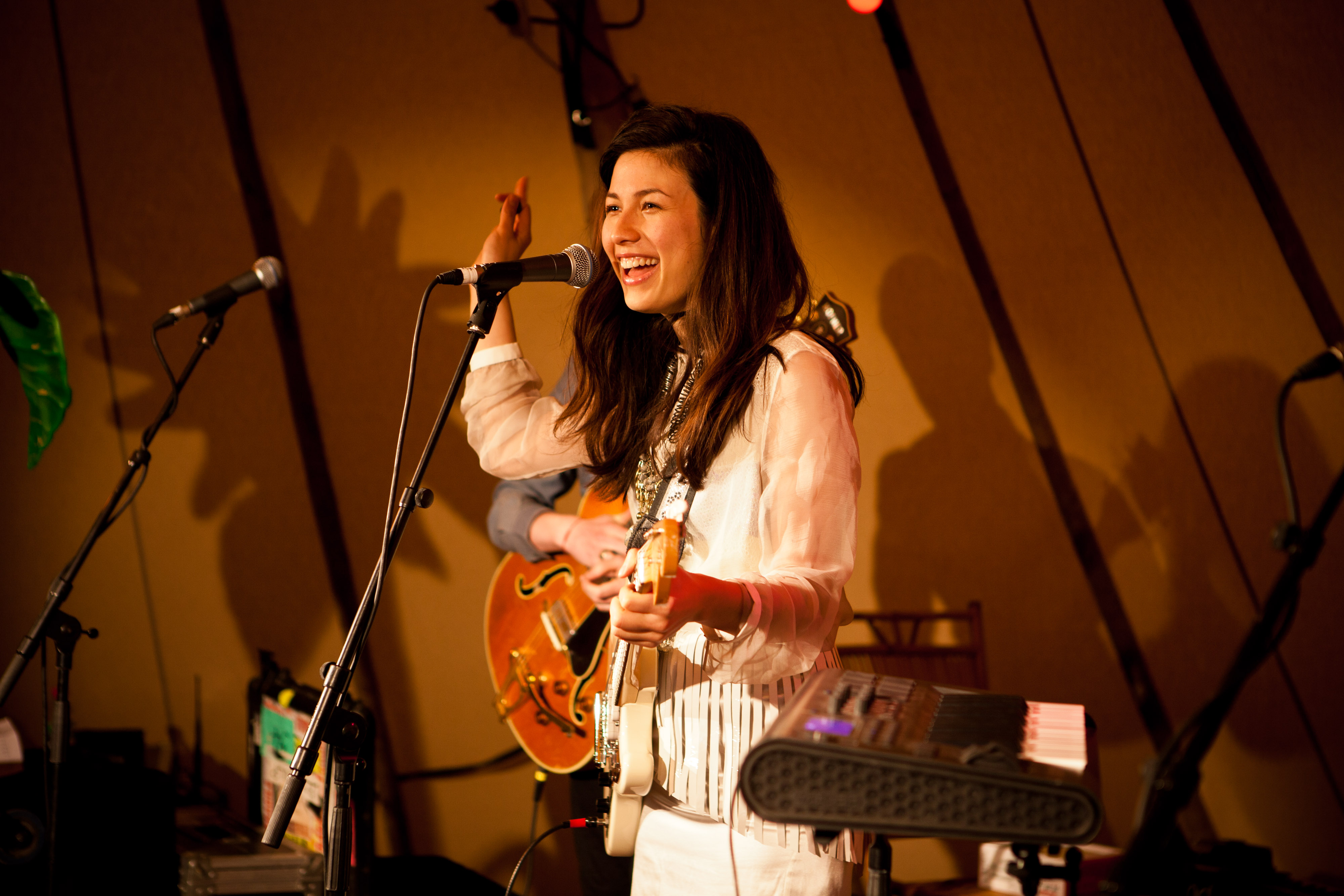

Background information
- Born: Emma-Lee Moss; November 4, 1983 (age 43); Hong Kong
- Origin: London, England
- Genres: Indie pop; indie folk; neofolk; anti-folk
- Occupation: Singer-songwriter
- Years active: 2006–2023
- Labels: Drowned in Sound, Fear and Records, Moshi Moshi, Close Harbour, Bella Union
- Members: Emma-Lee Moss
- Past members: Dani Markham
- Website: www.emmythegreat.com

Emma-Lee Moss (born 4 November 1983), known by her stage name Emmy the Great, is an English singer-songwriter. She has released four studio albums, First Love, Virtue, Second Love and April / 月音. She sings in English, Cantonese, and Mandarin.

== Early life and education ==
Moss was born in Hong Kong to an English father and a Chinese mother. Interested in music from a young age, she used to go by train to her nearest Tower Records shop so that she could buy the only non-Chinese music they had and, as a result, she developed a liking for bands such as Weezer, The Smashing Pumpkins, and The Lemonheads. A British citizen through her father, she moved with her family to London at the age of 11.

== Career ==
Her first credited appearance was as a singer on the Lightspeed Champion album Falling Off the Lavender Bridge. Her first recordings under the name Emmy the Great came in 2006, when she released a series of free demos over the internet while studying contemporary music at the University of Westminster

Moss began writing her debut album, First Love, in "dilapidated studios" owned by The Earlies in rural Lancashire and was released in February 2009. It spawned the singles "We Almost Had A Baby" and "First Love". The album was received with generally positive reviews, while The New York Times compiled their list of "Best Albums of the Year 2009" and ranked First Love at No. 7.

Her second album, Virtue, was released on 13 June 2011. The album's lead single "Iris" was released as a digital download on 29 April 2011. Speaking of the album's recording process, Moss said that, "It's been a very strange few months, and I can’t wait to make a record of them". Both albums are released on Emmy's own label, Close Harbour Records. After signing to the British label Bella Union, her third album Second Love was released in 2016. A version of Lost In You, the closing track on Second Love, was used as the soundtrack for Wonderland, the promotional film and associated idents for BBC One at Christmas 2018.

=== Collaborations ===
Moss has collaborated with several other artists, most notably Dev Hynes and Fatboy Slim (the latter as part of the Brighton Port Authority project). She has also worked with alternative rock band Ash on an acoustic studio re-recording of the single "D" – "Tracers" and also performed with them on their A-Z tour. Moss recorded a cover of Ash's song "Burn Baby Burn" which was the B-side to her single "First Love". Moss and Ash singer Tim Wheeler collaborated on a Christmas album, This Is Christmas, in 2011. In 2013, she announced on her Facebook page that she had contributed vocals and lyrics to Gabriel Bruce's debut album.

In 2011, Moss performed with Elizabeth Sankey of Summer Camp as a "super duo" singing "I've Never Had Sex" at the London Word Festival in 2011. Later that year, a portrait of Emmy the Great painted by British artist Joe Simpson was exhibited around the UK including a solo exhibition at The Royal Albert Hall.

In 2013, Moss recorded original songs for the soundtrack for Sony Pictures' Austenland, which appeared in the film alongside an original score by Ilan Eshkeri. In 2015, she wrote the end song for Mystery Show, a podcast by the broadcaster Starlee Kine.

In 2017, she wrote original music for Strangers, a series by the filmmaker Mia Lidofsky, as well as the original songs for comedian Sara Pascoe's stage adaptation of Jane Austen's Pride and Prejudice.

== Other writing ==
Moss has written for The Guardian, Vice Media and for music magazine The Stool Pigeon. An article of hers, based on her time in Omaha with Lightspeed Champion, is featured in the Stool Pigeon compilation book Grace Under Pressure. Her writing style has been praised as poetic.

== Personal life ==
During the writing of her second album Virtue, Moss' atheist fiancé underwent a religious conversion and left her as a result, moving abroad to serve as a Christian missionary. Her song "Trellick Tower" is thought to have been inspired by this. She has since dated collaborator Ash frontman Tim Wheeler.

== Discography ==
=== Studio albums ===
- First Love (Close Harbour, 2009)
- Virtue (Close Harbour, 2011)
- Second Love (Bella Union, 2016)
- April / 月音 (Bella Union, 2020)

=== Collaborative albums ===
- This is Christmas (Infectious, 2011) with Tim Wheeler
- Austenland Original Movie Soundtrack (Madison Gate, 2011) with Ilan Eshkeri

=== Live albums ===
- Acoustic Bonus CD – Live at 12 Bar, London (Rough Trade Shops, 2009)

=== EPs ===
- Take Me I'm Free self release (2006)
- My Bad (Moshi Moshi, 2008)
- Chris Moss EP Internet release (2007)
- Edward (Close Harbour, 2009)
- S (Bella Union, 2015)
- 再來的愛 (Plumeria, 2018)

=== Singles ===
- "Secret Circus/ The Hypnotist's Son" (Drowned in Sound, 2007)
- "Gabriel" 7" (Moshi Moshi, 2007)
- "We Almost Had A Baby" (Close Harbour, 2008)
- "First Love" (Close Harbour, 2009)
- "A Woman, A Woman, A Century of Sleep" complimentary download (2011)
- "Iris" (Close Harbour, 2011)
- "Paper Forest (In the Afterglow of Rapture)" (Close Harbour, 2011)
- "God of Loneliness" (Close Harbour, 2012)
- "Swimming Pool" (Bella Union, 2014)

=== Music videos ===
- "Gabriel" 7" (Moshi Moshi, 2007)
- "The Easter Parade" (2007)
- "We Almost Had a Baby" (2008)
- "First Love" (2009)
- "MIA" (2009)
- "Iris" (2011)
- "Paper Forest" (2011)
- "God of Loneliness" (2012)
- "Zombie Christmas" (2012)
- "Swimming Pool" (2014)
- "Algorithm" (2016)
- "Constantly (English version)" (2016)
- "Constantly (Chinese version)" (2016)
