= Thomas Leeb =

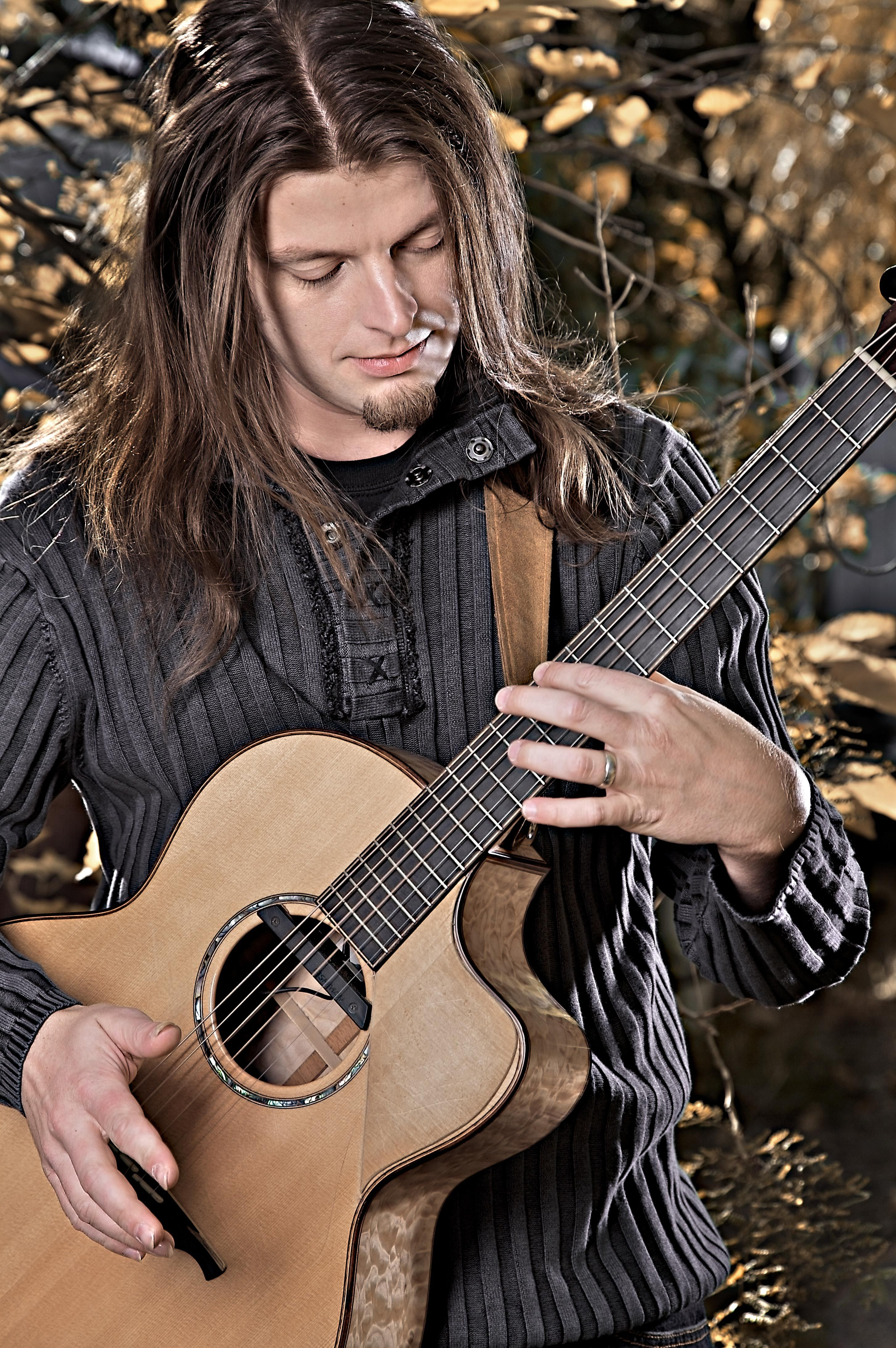

Background information
- Born: 14 September 1977 (age 49)
- Origin: Klagenfurt, Austria
- Occupation: Musician
- Instrument: Guitar
- Years active: 1992–present
- Website: www.thomasleeb.com

Thomas Leeb (born 14 September 1977 in Klagenfurt, Austria) is an Austrian fingerstyle guitarist.

== Biography ==
Thomas Leeb grew up in the small Austrian mountain village Turracher Höhe, Carinthia, as the youngest of four children of a hotel-owner's family. Over a period of thirteen years he taught himself the electric guitar, then switched to acoustic guitar. He was fifteen when he decided to become a musician and had his first concerts, even though his parents made him finish high school. He produced his first CD Reveller (now out of print) when he was seventeen. After high school he toured Ireland for four months as street musician. In 1997 he recorded his second CD Hope (out of print) and finished third in the 1998 Open Strings Festival in Osnabrück, Germany.

In 1999 Leeb published his third CD, Riddle, on the web portal MP3.com and studied at the California Institute of the Arts, focusing on world music and traditional music from Ghana. His teachers were percussionists Kobla and Alfred Ladzekpo, and guitarist Miroslav Tadić. Leeb graduated in 2003 with a Bachelor of Fine Arts. He produced his fourth album, Spark, in 2004 and went completely indie, selling the CDs from his website. In 2006 he recorded the CD Upside Down and in 2007 Desert Pirate.

Leeb tours incessantly, mainly in the US, in Europe (Austria, England, Germany, Ireland and Croatia) and in Asia (Taiwan, Korea and Japan); he has managed to build a worldwide fan community. He irregularly teaches as freelancer at two music schools in Los Angeles. Every summer he organizes a workshop at his Austrian hometown Turracher Höhe which is highly frequented, especially by British guitarists. Leeb taught master classes at the London Music School and the Guitar Institute of Technology in Hollywood. He was featured in several international guitar magazines, such as Guitar Player and Acoustic Guitar.^{,} ^{,} Leeb is an influence especially for young guitarists, for example Newton Faulkner.

Thomas Leeb is married and lives in Val Verde, California.

== Influences and technique ==
Thomas Leeb calls his music "the bastard child of acoustic guitar", combining unusual techniques, ideas and harmonies with a frank tongue-in-cheek attitude. His friend, Irish guitarist Eric Roche, called him "my brother in strings" and was a major support for his development. Roche held Leeb in high regard: "I was his teacher for about five minutes and then I heard him play." One of Leeb's main musical influences is Michael Hedges.

Leeb follows his own path as guitarist and composer, displaying a very idiosyncratic and particular guitar style. Characteristic for this style are percussive elements generated by hitting the guitar body with the heel of his hand or single fingers while playing intricate fingerstyle patterns. On his Desert Pirate CD he uses a scratch-board, glued to the surface of his guitar. With it he adds rhythmic scratch sounds to some of his pieces which are similar to typical DJ scratching sounds, despite their acoustic origin. Some of his pieces possess odd-meter measures and recall Eastern and Balkan music; much of his work is rhythmically complex and meticulously worked out.

Leeb is an endorsee of Lowden guitars and Parkwood Guitars. His guitars are amplified with a Fishman Rare Earth system (internal microphone/magnetic pickup combination). His live sound is produced by a K&K Pure Western soundboard transducer. His additional technical equipment encompasses L.R. Baggs Para and Highlander PAM DI boxes as well as an Alesis NanoVerb system.

== Discography ==
- Reveller (1994)
- Hope (1997)
- riddle (1999)
- Spark (2004)
- Upside Down (2006)
- Desert Pirate (2007)
- No Alibis (2011)
- Trickster (2015)
- Radio Hill (2021)
