= Paper Forest (In the Afterglow of Rapture) =

Single by Emmy the Great

from the album Virtue
- Released: 18 September 2011
- Genre: Anti-folk, alternative rock
- Length: 3:41
- Label: Close Harbour Records
- Songwriter: Emmy the Great
- Producer: Gareth Jones

Emmy the Great singles chronology
| "Iris" (2011) | "Paper Forest (In the Afterglow of Rapture)" (2011) | "God of Loneliness" (2012) |

Paper Forest (In the Afterglow of Rapture) is a song by Emmy the Great, released in 2011 on her second album, Virtue. It was released as a single on 18 September 2011. Emmy the Great stated that the song was based on lyrics from Patti Smith's song Dancing Barefoot, from her 1979 album Wave. In an interview explaining the album, Emmy the Great has said that singer Patti Smith influenced the song.

== Music video ==
A music video, directed by Lucy Needs was uploaded to YouTube on 16 September 2011. In the video, Emmy the Great plays the part of a carer for a former dancer. NME placed the video at number 14 on their top 50 videos of 2011, despite giving the album a rather negative review.
