= Strip Me (song) =

Single by Natasha Bedingfield

from the album Strip Me and Morning Glory soundtrack
- B-side: "Unexpected Hero"
- Released: 31 August 2010
- Recorded: Sub Zero Studios (Santa Monica); Patriot Studios (Denver)
- Genre: Pop; R&B
- Length: 3:29
- Label: Phonogenic; Epic
- Songwriters: Natasha Bedingfield; Ryan Tedder; Wayne Wilkins
- Producers: Wilkins; Tedder; Bedingfield

Natasha Bedingfield singles chronology
"Touch" (2010)	"Strip Me" (2010)	"Jet Lag" (2011)

Music video
- "Strip Me" on YouTube

"Strip Me" is a song performed by British singer-songwriter Natasha Bedingfield. The song is the title track and second single from her third studio album, Strip Me, and was co-written and co-produced by Ryan Tedder. The song was sent to US radio on 31 August 2010 and later to online music stores on 21 September. The single debuted at number 95 on the Billboard Hot 100 on the week of 6 November 2010 and peaked at number 91.

The song is the official theme song for the 2010 film Morning Glory, being featured in the trailer and in the ending credits.

== Critical reception ==
Jonathan Keefe from Slant Magazine said, positively, that: "Strip Me includes a whole lot of Ryan Tedder's trademark echo-heavy, CAPSLOCK drum-machine arrangements. There's something meta about the laziness in the production of the title track, in that Bedingfield hasn't changed her tune since the days of "Unwritten," so Tedder gives the song only the most insignificant of variations on his "Halo" and "Already Gone", template. Bedingfield uses her raspy warble to full effect, singing lines like "I'm only one voice in a million/But you ain't takin' that from me" as though her very life depended on it, but it's nothing that either she or Tedder haven't already done better before". The song was one of the Track Pick on the Allmusic review.

== Chart performance ==
"Strip Me" made its US Billboard Hot 100 chart debut at number 95 on 6 November 2010, where it remained for just one week. However, in the week following the release of her album of the same name, "Strip Me" re-entered the Hot 100 at a new peak of 91. To date, it is one of Bedingfield's least successful singles. However, the song was more successful on the Adult Pop Songs radio format where it logged eight weeks on the chart and peaked at number 23.

== Music video ==
According to Bedingfield herself, through her Twitter account, she went back to her hometown London to shoot the video for the song with photographer and director Kathie Rankin. The music video premiered 3 November 2010. It features Bedingfield performing in various outfits. The video starts with a black figure of Bedingfield singing the song. She performs the verse while off-screen characters have her change in different outfits. The chorus then shifted in showing her singing in a shiny fur, leather and tribal-like outfit. The next verse shows off-screen characters doing her make-up while she is singing with a megaphone. The second chorus shows her wearing a police cap and a scene where she is crawling on mud. In the bridge, Bedingfield is in a lace dress singing in a black and white patterns. When it goes to the chorus, she threw paints of different colors on the wall and mud-scene returns through while Bedingfield is singing. The last scenes involves her removing all of the outfits that the off-screen characters are trying on her then shifting on her singing with the megaphone. She then fades to black as the video ends.

== Promotion ==
The song is the official theme song for the 2010 film Morning Glory, being featured in the trailer and in the ending credits. According to All Access, the single moved to number 79 on the iTunes Top Songs Chart selling 7,000 copies just four days after the song was featured on the trailer for Morning Glory.

Bedingfield performed the song on Live with Regis and Kelly and Today Show. She also performed it on The Tonight Show with Jay Leno.

== Track listing ==
- Digital download
1. "Strip Me" – 3:30
- CD single
1. "Strip Me" – 3:31
2. "Unexpected Hero" – 3:25 (written by Natasha Bedingfield and Daniel Carey) (produced by Dan Carey)
3. "Unwritten" featuring Carney – 3:44

== Charts ==
Chart (2010)	Peak position
Canada (Canadian Hot 100)	65
Netherlands (Dutch Top 40 Tipparade)	17
US Billboard Hot 100	91
US Adult Pop Songs	23

== Radio adds and release history ==
Region	Date	Format	Label
United States	31 August 2010	Hot AC, and Top 40 mainstream radio	Epic Records
United States	21 September 2010	Digital download	Epic Records
