= Get Free (Major Lazer song) =

Single by Major Lazer featuring Amber Coffman

from the album Free the Universe
- Released: 18 May 2012
- Recorded: 2011
- Genre: Dancehall; dub
- Length: 4:49
- Label: Downtown
- Songwriters: Thomas Wesley Pentz; David James Andrew Taylor; David Longstreth; Amber Coffman

Major Lazer singles chronology
"Original Don" (2011)	"Get Free" (2012)	"Jah No Partial" (2012)

Amber Coffman singles chronology
"Hold On" (2010)	"Get Free" (2012)	"She Knows" (2013)

"Get Free" is a song by musical project Major Lazer from their second studio album Free the Universe (2013). The song was released as a digital download on May 18, 2012. The song features vocals from American singer and musician Amber Coffman.

== Music video ==
A lyric video to accompany the release of "Get Free" was first released onto YouTube on 15 April 2012 at a total length of five minutes. The official video, directed by So Me, was released on 23 August 2012. Filmed in Kingston, Jamaica, "Get Free" takes the viewer on a candid journey of Jamaican culture. Both Coffman and Diplo make appearances.

== Newton Faulkner cover ==
In 2015, English singer Newton Faulkner recorded "Get Free" for his fifth studio album, Human Love. The cover of the song was released as the lead single from the album on 27 November 2015, while a music video was released on 15 September 2015.

== Track listing ==
Digital download
No.	Title	Length
1.	"Get Free" (featuring Amber Coffman)	4:49
2.	"Get Free" (Bonde Do Role Remix; featuring Amber Coffman)	3:43
3.	"Get Free" (Andy C Remix; featuring Amber Coffman)	5:31

== Chart performance ==
=== Weekly charts ===
Chart (2012–13)	Peak position
Australia (ARIA)	39
Belgium (Ultratop 50 Flanders)	3
Belgium (Ultratop 50 Wallonia)	17
Denmark (Tracklisten)	29
France (SNEP)	59
Germany (GfK)	73
Netherlands (Dutch Top 40)	8
Netherlands (Single Top 100)	7
Romania (Romanian Top 100)	4
UK Dance (Official Charts)	13
UK Singles (Official Charts)	56

Chart (2017)	Peak position
Poland Airplay (ZPAV)	27
Poland (Video Chart)	3

=== Year-end charts ===
Chart (2012)	position
Belgium (Ultratop Flanders)	18
Belgium (Ultratop Wallonia)	88
Netherlands (Dutch Top 40)	49
Netherlands (Single Top 100)	42

== Certifications ==
Region	Certification	Certified units/sales
Australia (ARIA)	Gold	35,000^{^}
Belgium (BRMA)	Gold	15,000^{*}
New Zealand (RMNZ)	2× Platinum	60,000^{‡}
United Kingdom (BPI)	Silver	200,000^{‡}
^{*} Sales figures based on certification alone.^{^} Shipments figures based on certification alone.^{‡} Sales+streaming figures based on certification alone.

== Release history ==
Region	Date	Format	Label
United Kingdom	May 18, 2012	Digital download	Downtown

== Popular culture ==
"Get Free" was featured over the end credits of Barely Lethal (2015), and in the 2017 movie Baywatch.
