= I Hate Mondays (song) =

Single by Newton Faulkner
- Released: 16 July 2010 (Australia)
- Recorded: 8 April 2010
- Genre: Alternative, acoustic, comedy pop
- Length: 4:02
- Label: Blue Sky Music
- Songwriter(s): Michael Horgan (Horgs) (Hamish & Andy Show)

Newton Faulkner singles chronology
"Let's Get Together" (2009)	"I Hate Mondays" (2010)	"Write It On Your Skin" (2012)

"I Hate Mondays" is a song by English singer-songwriter and musician Newton Faulkner. The song was released on 16 July 2010 in Australia. The song peaked at number 8 on the Australian Singles Chart. The lyrics to the song were written by Michael "Horgs" Horgan for the Hamish & Andy Show; specifically, the lyrics were made for a segment of the show called "Horgs' Inventions", where Horgs noted that there hadn't been any songs about hating Mondays in a long time. Harry Connick Jr also performed a version of the song, but his version was not officially released as a single.

== Track listing ==
Digital download

1. "I Hate Mondays" - 4:02

== Chart performance ==
Chart (2010)	Peak position
Australia (ARIA)	8

== Release history ==
Region	Date	Format	Label
Australia	16 July 2010	Digital download	Blue Sky Music
