= First Love (Emmy the Great album) =

Studio album by Emmy the Great
- Released: 9 February 2009
- Genre: Anti-folk
- Length: 43:02
- Label: Close Harbour Records
- Producers: Emma-Lee Moss, Euan Hinshelwood, Tom Rogerson, The Earlies

Emmy the Great chronology
First Love (2009)	Virtue (2011)

Singles from First Love
- 1. "We Almost Had A Baby" Released: 10 November 2008; 2. "First Love" Released: 23 February 2009

First Love is the debut studio album from the London singer-songwriter Emma-Lee Moss, better known by her stage name Emmy the Great. It was released on 9 February 2009 on the UK-based indie label Close Harbour Records. Around the 10-year anniversary of First Love, Emmy re-released the album on vinyl on 14 June 2019 and embarked on a tour, performing the album in music venues around the UK, also in June 2019.

== Background ==
Moss explains that she never chose to write any of the album's songs any certain way, "they just came out". She does, however, admit that "...breaking up with my boyfriend when I did had a huge influence." She describes the album as "a record of the time that it was made, and the time I spent waiting for it to come out, and now that time is over. It's actually quite weird that other people are only just hearing it. Members of my family will bring up a song and I’ll be like, 'that is so 2008.'"

The first single, "We Almost Had A Baby", was released on 10 November 2008. In January 2009, a promotional version of the album was leaked on a number of music forums. Moss then posted a blog on her MySpace page asking people not to download it, saying that the first run of promos had been of the wrong master, and were of a lower quality than the album that would be released officially.

Music videos were released for "We Almost Had A Baby", "First Love" and "MIA".

== Critical response ==
Professional ratings
Review scores
Source	Rating
Allmusic	link
Drowned in Sound	link
MOJO	3/5 stars
NME	link
Sunday Tribune	4/5 stars
The Times	link

The album met with generally positive reviews on release. British webzine Drowned in Sound praised it as "a triumph, with a maturity beyond her years, and with a humour no less enjoyable for being subtle", while The Guardian described Moss' style as "ultra-wordy, but also articulate and interesting." NME, however, was more equivocal, criticising her "constant stance of diary-entry victimhood" as becoming "more grating than engaging". Moss' songwriting was widely praised, with webzine TwistedEar saying that her lyrics are "Emmy the Great's secret weapon, and save First Love from mediocrity."

The album was ranked at No. 7 on The New York Times "Albums of the Year 2009" list.

== Track listing ==
No.	Title	Length
1.	"Absentee"	3:57
2.	"24"	3:01
3.	"We Almost Had A Baby"	2:55
4.	"The Easter Parade"	3:26
5.	"Dylan"	3:32
6.	"On The Museum Island"	4:10
7.	"War"	1:53
8.	"First Love"	4:36
9.	"MIA"	3:25
10.	"The Easter Parade (Pt. 2)"	1:45
11.	"Bad Things Coming, We Are Safe"	4:00
12.	"Everything Reminds Me of You"	5:54
13.	"City Song"	3:08
Total length:		43:02

Bonus Edition Tracks
No.	Title	Length
14.	"Edward Is Dedward"	3:53
15.	"A Bowl Collecting Blood"	3:47
16.	"Two Steps Forward"	4:36
17.	"Canopies And Drapes"	3:45

Japan bonus tracks
No.	Title	Length
18.	"Gabriel"
19.	"Hypnotists Son"
20.	"Short Country Song"
21.	"Where Is My Mind?"
22.	"Burn Baby Burn"
