= Yokoku =

Single by Aiko
- Released: November 29, 2017
- Genre: Pop
- Length: 3:58
- Label: Pony Canyon
- Songwriter: Aiko
- Producer: Aiko

Aiko singles chronology
"Koi o Shita no wa" (2016)	"Yokoku" (2017)

Audio sample
- "Yokoku": file; help

"Yokoku" (予告(よこく); lit. "Notice") is a song recorded by Japanese singer-songwriter Aiko. It was released as a single by Pony Canyon on November 29, 2017. The song premiered on the JOLF radio program Takashi Okamura's All Night Nippon on November 2, 2017. The song, written and composed by Aiko, is arranged by Oster, who is credited under the solo unit name Oster Project. The first pressing of the CD single includes an eight-page booklet and alternative cover artwork.

== Background ==
"Yokoku" is Aiko's first single in over a year, since "Koi o Shita no wa" (2016). Aiko wrote the song to cheer herself up, intending for it to serve as a sort of personal anthem.

== Chart performance ==
With 26,000 copies sold in its first week, "Yokoku" debuted at number 3 on the Oricon Singles Chart, becoming her third consecutive single to do so. "Yokoku" also became Aiko's thirty-fourth single to rank in the top ten. The single charted for seven weeks on the chart and sold a reported total of 31,000 copies. The song also peaked within the top ten on Billboard Japan's Hot 100 on its fourth charting week, jumping eighty-four positions from number 88 to number 4.

== Track listing ==
All tracks are written by Aiko.

No.	Title	Arranger(s)	Length
1.	"Yokoku" (予告, "Notice")	Oster Project	3:58
2.	"Machigai Sagashi" (間違い探し, "Looking for Mistakes")	Oster Project	5:14
3.	"Tsuki ga Tokeru" (月が溶ける, "The Moon is Melting")	Kanō Kawashima	5:57
4.	"Yokoku" (Instrumental)	Oster Project	3:56
Total length:			19:06

== Charts ==
Chart (2017)	Peak position
Japan Weekly Singles (Oricon)	3
Japan Weekly Digital Singles (Oricon)	14
Japan Hot 100 (Billboard)	4
Japan Download Songs (Billboard)	18
Japan Top Singles Sales (Billboard)	4

== Sales ==
Region	Certification	Certified units/sales
Japan	—	38,000
