= Alfred Ladzekpo =

West African music and dance teacher

Alfred Ladzekpo (born 20th century) is a retired West African music and dance teacher who plays the violin.

== Early life and education ==
Ladzepko was introduced to the art of Ewe drumming by his father, Kofi Ladzekpo, and his elder brother, Husunu Ladzekpo. At the age of thirteen, he was one of the founders of the music and dance troupe Lashibi Agahu. In 1957, he formed a band at Anlo Awoame Fia School; later, he was a drummer for the Gbeho Research Society, the Uhuru Dance Company, and the National Dance Company in Accra.

== Career ==
In 1969, Ladzepko records African music in New York. He studied journalism at California State University, Northridge, until 1974. He later gave theater musical studies, and dance classes in Israel. Since 1994, he has taught in the music faculty at Pomona College. He studied for three years at Columbia University, where he taught workshops on African music and African dance, and is co-director of the African Music and Dance Programme at the California Institute of the Arts (CalArts). He wrote three African musicals, most recently FeFe, music, dance and theatre.

He was a teacher for 41 years. He has written articles on African music and dance from 1980 to 2012, with 19 works in 23 books in 2 languages. He has performed mostly in the eastern United States as well as in Ghana and has given talk shows, demonstrations and taught music and hall workshops in Israel and the eastern United States.

He attended the first international symposium in 1992 in Amsterdam on world music education. He recorded African dance and Sports in 1969 in New York City.

He was executive director of the African music and dance programme and was a principal violinist at Cal Arts. He has been the lead drummer in Accra, Ghana, for the Uhuru Dance Band, the Ghebo Research Group, and the National Dance Company. He taught African music and dance at Columbia University for nearly four years. He had been an African violin teacher at the American university Cal Arts since 1970. His farewell service was held at the Cal Arts World Music and Dance Festival. He retired at the end of the semester after teaching for 41 years at the Cal Arts Institute.
