= Virtue (Emmy the Great album) =

Studio album by Emmy the Great
- Released: 13 June 2011
- Recorded: 2010–2011
- Genre: Alternative rock, anti-folk
- Label: Close Harbour Records
- Producer: Gareth Jones

Emmy the Great chronology
First Love (2009)	Virtue (2011)

Virtue is the second album by London singer-songwriter Emma-Lee Moss–better known by the stage name Emmy the Great—and was released on 13 June 2011. It has been described as "meticulous and atmospheric" and has been praised for its poetic writing style.

== Background ==
The album mixes themes from myths, fairy tales and saints' lives. Moss initially wanted the album to tell a story entirely from the point of view of various "characters", both fictional and historical, however, while writing the album, Moss' fiancé converted to Christianity and their relationship came to an end. As a result of this, Virtue would become, much like First Love, a very personal album. Moss explains that she "had this really weird period where I was supposed to be getting married... I was actually reading lots about theology because I didn’t understand what had happened." The album was recorded shortly after the summer in which her wedding was cancelled, with Gareth Jones (notable for working with Depeche Mode, Einstürzende Neubauten, Wire and Erasure) given the job to produce the album.

The release of her début album First Love was delayed due to a lack of confidence and Moss' disillusion and frustration with record labels and managers who wished to alter her song writing. As a result, to fund and release her second album, Emmy the Great partnered with Pledgemusic, an online Direct-to-Fan / Fan-funded music platform utilising a Threshold Pledge System / Provision Point Mechanism that facilitates musicians reaching out to their fan-base to financially contribute to upcoming recordings or other musical projects. Moss commented that, "instead of relying entirely on a label to make and tour our record, we can skip the middle man and go directly to you, the fans for support. It makes sense for us, because we’ve always tried to work outside of the traditional record label model.

On 18 April 2011, RCRD LBL released a free download of the track "A Woman, A Woman, A Century of Sleep", while on 29 April 2011, the album's lead single, "Iris" was released.

== Critical response ==
Professional ratings
Review scores
Source	Rating
Drowned in Sound	link
All Music	link
Hi-Fi News	(9.4/10)
Financial Times	4/5 stars
The Fly	4/5 stars
Manchester Evening News	5/5 stars
MOJO	4/5 stars
musicOMH	4/5 stars
NME	link
The Daily Telegraph	4/5 stars
The Times	4/5 stars
Uncut	4/5 stars
Pitchfork	6.3/10

The album met with generally positive reviews upon release. The BBC gave a favourable review, commenting that, "Resigned but never accusatory, it makes for poignant reassurance that sometimes feeling utterly bewildered and lost is not only natural, but a strange and unmistakeable cause for optimism." The Guardian claimed Moss to be, "One of the boldest young writers in pop today." while the Evening Standard insisted that Virtue is "What folk music has been praying for."

The album entered the UK Albums Chart at No. 84.

== Track listing ==
No.	Title	Length
1.	"Dinosaur Sex"	5:37
2.	"A Woman, A Woman, A Century of Sleep"	4:08
3.	"Iris"	3:39
4.	"Paper Forest (In the Afterglow of Rapture)"	3:41
5.	"Cassandra"	3:33
6.	"Creation"	5:10
7.	"Sylvia"	4:32
8.	"Exit Night / Juliet's Theme"	6:08
9.	"North"	4:40
10.	"Trellick Tower"	4:11

Japan bonus tracks
No.	Title	Length
11.	"God of Loneliness"
12.	"Paper Forest"
13.	"Emily"
14.	"Lost in Austin (Acoustic)"
15.	"One Person Playing Two Roles"

== Charts ==
=== Chart positions ===
Chart (2011)	Peak position
UK Albums Chart	84
