= Rebuilt by Humans =

Studio album by Newton Faulkner
- Released: 28 September 2009
- Recorded: Spring 2009–Summer 2009
- Genre: Folk rock, pop rock, art rock
- Length: 53:13
- Label: Ugly Truth Records
- Producer: Mike Spencer

Newton Faulkner chronology
Hand Built by Robots (2007)	Rebuilt by Humans (2009)	Write It on Your Skin (2012)

Singles from Rebuilt by Humans
- 1. "If This Is It"; 2. "Over and Out"; 3. "Let's Get Together"

Rebuilt by Humans is the second album by British singer-songwriter Newton Faulkner. It was released on 28 September 2009. "If This Is It" was released as the first single from the album, with "Over and Out" being the second single and "Let's Get Together" being the third single.

== Title ==
Regarding the album's title, Faulkner stated:

It's based around an accident I had, where I basically broke my wrist on Boxing Day, five days before I was meant to start recording the second album. So it was like a really proper close call and they used a rather large metal plate, in fact they were using the x-ray as part of at the artwork, when you take the CD out of the case it's going to be behind that.

== Track listing ==
All tracks are written by Newton Faulkner, except where noted.

No.	Title	Writer(s)	Length
1.	"Intro (Interlude)"		0:33
2.	"Badman"	N. Faulkner, Toby Faulkner	3:08
3.	"I Took it Out on You"	N. Faulkner, T. Faulkner	2:56
4.	"Hello (Interlude)"	N. Faulkner, T. Faulkner	0:31
5.	"If This is It"	N. Faulkner, Adam Argyle	4:02
6.	"Resin on My Heart Strings"		4:09
7.	"Lipstick Jungle"	N. Faulkner, Dee Adam	4:18
8.	"Been Thinking About It"		3:30
9.	"Let's Get Together"	N. Faulkner, T. Faulkner	2:42
10.	"She's Got the Time 2 (Interlude)"		1:17
11.	"Won't Let Go"	N. Faulkner, Keigo Oyamada	3:34
12.	"Resin Theramins (Interlude)"		0:28
13.	"First Time"	N. Faulkner, A. Argyle	3:41
14.	"Over and Out"	N. Faulkner, Ben Earle, Craigie Dodds	3:19
15.	"Cheltenham (Interlude)"		0:49
16.	"So Much"		3:41
17.	"This Town"	N. Faulkner, D. Adam	3:34
18.	"I'm Not Giving Up Yet"		3:55

iTunes bonus track
No.	Title	Length
19.	"Soundwaves"	3:19

== Certifications ==
Region	Certification	Certified units/sales
Australia (ARIA)	Gold	35,000^{^}
^{^} Shipments figures based on certification alone.
