= Dream Catch Me =

2007 single by Newton Faulkner

Single by Newton Faulkner

from the album Hand Built by Robots
- B-side: "Ageing Superhero" (demo)
- Released: 2 July 2007
- Genre: Soft rock
- Length: 3:56
- Label: Sony BMG; Brightside; Ugly Truth
- Songwriters: Crispin Hunt; Newton Faulkner; Gordon Mills
- Producer: Mike Spencer

Newton Faulkner singles chronology
"I Need Something" (2007)	"Dream Catch Me" (2007)	"Teardrop" (2007)

Music video
- "Dream Catch Me" on YouTube

"Dream Catch Me" is a song written by Crispin Hunt, Newton Faulkner, and Gordon Mills, produced by Mike Spencer and performed by Faulkner. In Europe, it was the third single to be released from his 2007 debut album, Hand Built by Robots, while in North America, it was released as the first single. It reached the top 10 in the United Kingdom and Australia, peaking at numbers seven and five, respectively. In Australia, the song stayed in the top 10 for 12 weeks and ended 2008 as the country's 17th-best-selling single. It was Australia's 97th-best-selling single of the 2000s decade.

== Composition ==
"Dream Catch Me" is three minutes and fifty-six seconds in length. According to the digital sheet music published on Musicnotes, the song is written in common time with a tempo of 115 beats per minutes and a key of D major.

== Chart performance ==
On 5 August 2007, the single debuted at number 16 on the UK Singles Chart, rising to its peak of number seven the following week. Spending 43 weeks in the top 100 during its initial chart run, it has resurfaced on the UK Singles Chart on several occasions, with its latest appearance on 16 February 2014, bringing the song's chart tally up to 48 weeks. In 2007, it was ranked the 67th-highest-selling single in the UK, and it has since been certified platinum by the British Phonographic Industry, denoting sales and streaming figures of over 600,000. It was not as successful in Ireland, where it reached number 46 and spent three weeks on the Irish Singles Chart. It also briefly charted in the Flanders region of Belgium in 2007, attaining a peak of number seven on the Ultratip Bubbling Under listing.

In mid-2008, "Dream Catch Me" began to garner success in several other regions. On 23 March 2008, it debuted on Australia's ARIA Singles Chart at number 47. After rising up the chart for several weeks, it entered the top 10 on 20 April and peaked at number five two weeks later. It spent a further eight weeks in the top 10 and remained on the Australian chart for 32 weeks in total. It finish at number 17 on the ARIA year-end ranking for 2008, and it was Australia's 97th-most successful song of the 2000s decade. To date, it is certified double platinum by the Australian Recording Industry Association for shipping over 140,000 units. In New Zealand, the single spent a single week on the RIANZ Singles Chart, at number 38 on 15 September 2008. It appeared on the German Singles Chart in April, debuting at its peak of number 39 and staying there for another week before descending the chart. In the United States, it gained airplay on adult-pop radio, rising to number 24 on the Billboard Adult Top 40 chart in July 2008.

== Track listings ==
UK and Australian CD single

1. "Dream Catch Me"
2. "Ageing Superhero" (home demo)

European maxi-CD single

1. "Dream Catch Me"
2. "Ageing Superhero" (home demo)
3. "Alone Again"
4. "Dream Catch Me" (video)

== Charts ==
=== Weekly charts ===
Chart (2007–2008)	Peak position
Australia (ARIA)	5
Belgium (Ultratip Bubbling Under Flanders)	7
Germany (GfK)	39
Ireland (IRMA)	46
New Zealand (Recorded Music NZ)	38
Scottish Singles Sales (Official Charts)	25
UK Singles (Official Charts)	7
US Adult Pop Airplay (Billboard)	24

=== Year-end charts ===
Chart (2007)	Position
UK Singles (OCC)	67

Chart (2008)	Position
Australia (ARIA)	17
UK Singles (OCC)	169

=== Decade-end charts ===
Chart (2000–2009)	Position
Australia (ARIA)	97

== Certifications ==
Region	Certification	Certified units/sales
Australia (ARIA)	2× Platinum	140,000^{^}
United Kingdom (BPI)	Platinum	600,000^{‡}
^{^} Shipments figures based on certification alone.^{‡} Sales+streaming figures based on certification alone.

== Release history ==
Region	Date	Format(s)	Label(s)	Ref.
Australia	2 July 2007	Digital download	Sony BMG; Brightside; Ugly Truth	
New Zealand	2 July 2007	Digital download	Sony BMG; Brightside; Ugly Truth	
United States	2 July 2007	Digital download	Sony BMG; Brightside; Ugly Truth	
United Kingdom	9 July 2007	Digital download	Sony BMG; Brightside; Ugly Truth	
United Kingdom	16 July 2007	CD	Sony BMG; Brightside; Ugly Truth	
