= Hand Built by Robots =

Studio album by Newton Faulkner
- Released: 30 July 2007
- Genres: Folk rock, pop rock
- Length: 43:30
- Labels: Brightside, Ugly Truth, Peermusic
- Producers: Mike Spencer, Andy McKim

Newton Faulkner chronology
Hand Built by Robots (2007)	Rebuilt by Humans (2009)

Singles from Hand built by Robots
- 1. "I Need Something"; 2. "Dream Catch Me"; 3. "All I Got"; 4. "Teardrop"; 5. "I Need Something (re-release)" 6. "Gone in the Morning"

Professional ratings
Review scores
Source	Rating
AllMusic	
Billboard	Review
Click Music	2/5 stars
entertainment.ie	Review
Gilde	Review
The Guardian	Review
IndieLondon	Review
Times Online	

Hand Built by Robots is the debut studio album by English singer-songwriter Newton Faulkner. Produced by Mike Spencer, it was released on 30 July 2007 on Ugly Truth Records. Preceded by the single "Dream Catch Me", the album initially charted at number 3 in the UK album chart, and subsequently reached number one in its fourth week. Regarding the album's success, Faulkner stated, "I don't think anyone involved in Hand Built by Robots actually thought it would do that at all."

== Writing and composition ==
Regarding the album's composition, Faulkner stated, in 2009, that the album was "actually quite rushed in a lot of ways. 'Dream Catch Me' was actually released before we finished the album, so we had to move really fast to complete Hand Built By Robots. The album wasn't the culmination of ten years worth of writing, but was a few months of panic, and a couple of things I had lying around - a couple of older songs that were still good enough to be used. [...] A lot of Hand Built By Robot's songs were written in the last few months leading up to recording, as I became better at writing."

Four tracks on the album were co-written with former Longpigs vocalist Crispin Hunt and two were co-written by Adam Argyle, who is perhaps best known for writing "Next Best Superstar" for Melanie C.

== Album cover ==
The album cover art work includes a number of historical figures standing upon a robotic hand.

== Release ==
"I Need Something" originally released on Newton's Full Fat EP and became the first single taken from Hand Built by Robots. It was available for download on 16 April 2007 and available to buy on 7 May, reaching #107 in the UK Charts in May 2007. The B-side is a live version of Newton's SpongeBob SquarePants theme, also including a special rendition of "Junglebob". There have been two music videos released for the song. "I Need Something" was re-released as a download only single on 31 March 2008 and was A-listed on BBC Radio 1's playlist. "I Need Something" was released as a CD single in Australia on 20 September 2008.

The second single, "All I Got" was released on 19 October 2007 as the album's third single. The song was written by Newton Faulkner, Crispin Hunt and produced by Mike Spencer. The song peaked to number 59 on the UK Singles Chart.

== Track listing ==
All tracks are written by Newton Faulkner, except where noted.

No.	Title	Writer(s)	Length
1.	"Intro"		0:34
2.	"To the Light"		2:40
3.	"I Need Something"		2:57
4.	"All I Got"	Newton Faulkner, Crispin Hunt	3:21
5.	"Dream Catch Me"	C. Hunt, N. Faulkner, Gordon Mills	3:56
6.	"Feels Like Home"		3:12
7.	"Teardrop"	Robert Del Naja, Grantley Marshall, Andrew Vowles, Elizabeth Fraser	3:09
8.	"Gone in the Morning"	N. Faulkner, Toby Faulkner	2:21
9.	"Sitar-y Thing"		1:19
10.	"Uncomfortably Slow"	N. Faulkner, Adam Argyle	3:28
11.	"Straight Towards the Sun"	N. Faulkner, C. Hunt	3:39
12.	"People Should Smile More"	N. Faulkner, A. Argyle, C. Hunt	3:29
13.	"She's Got the Time"	N. Faulkner, T. Faulkner	1:20
14.	"U.F.O"	N. Faulkner, T. Faulkner	2:36
15.	"Face (Her)"		0:39
16.	"Ageing Superhero"		3:22
17.	"Lullaby"		1:37

Bonus tracks
No.	Title	Writer(s)	Length
18.	"Full Fat" (exclusive to iTunes)		2:50
19.	"Dream Catch Me" (instrumental)	C. Hunt, N. Faulkner, G. Mills	4:09

== Chart performance ==
Hand Built by Robots was certified platinum and later double platinum, in the United Kingdom, and was the twentieth best-selling album of 2007, selling 444,000 copies.

The album debuted at number 26 on the Australian ARIA Albums Chart in March 2008. It subsequently ascended fifteen places the following week to number 11, and then to number 8. The album eventually peaked at number 5 the week after. It has since been certified Gold on the ARIA charts.

The album was released in Germany on 18 April 2008, and in the United States (it did not have massive success in the U.S. but did manage to reach number 42 on the Billboard Top Heatseekers chart) and Canada on 29 April 2008, with the first single being "Dream Catch Me".

== Charts ==
=== Weekly charts ===
Chart (2007–08)	Peak position
Australian Albums (ARIA)	5
German Albums (Offizielle Top 100)	50
Irish Albums (IRMA)	10
New Zealand Albums (RMNZ)	31
Scottish Albums (Official Charts)	3
Swiss Albums (Schweizer Hitparade)	96
UK Albums (Official Charts)	1

=== Year-end charts ===
Chart (2007)	Position
UK Albums (OCC)	20
Chart (2008)	Position
Australian Albums (ARIA)	32
UK Albums (OCC)	50

== Certifications ==
Region	Certification	Certified units/sales
Australia (ARIA)	Platinum	70,000^{^}
United Kingdom (BPI)	2× Platinum	600,000^{^}
^{^} Shipments figures based on certification alone.
