= Burn Baby Burn (song) =

2001 single by Ash

Single by Ash

from the album Free All Angels
- B-side: "13th Floor"; "Only in Dreams"; "Thinking About You"; "Submission" (remix)
- Released: 2 April 2001
- Genre: Power pop
- Length: 3:31
- Label: Infectious; Home Grown
- Songwriter: Tim Wheeler
- Producer: Owen Morris

Ash singles chronology
"Shining Light" (2001)	"Burn Baby Burn" (2001)	"Sometimes" (2001)

Alternative cover
- CD 2 cover

"Burn Baby Burn" is a song by Ash, released as the second single from the Free All Angels album on 2 April 2001, reaching number 13 on the UK Singles Chart and number 20 in Ireland. It was released as a single CD (released on 2CD formats, the second of which being an enhanced CD) and as a 7" vinyl, and was also released for the first time on DVD format. The song can also be found on the Intergalactic Sonic 7″s hits collection.

== Background and release ==
"Burn Baby Burn" was originally written for "Nu-Clear Sounds" but did not make the cut. However, Mark Hamilton liked the riff, and encouraged Wheeler to re-write parts of the song, namely the chorus. Wheeler came up with the chorus while driving back to his parents' house from Belfast, and wrote it down when he got home. He said a personal breakup inspired the song.

Originally the track was titled "This Is Slow Suicide", then simply "Slow Suicide", but was changed at the last minute to "Burn Baby Burn" to avoid radio censorship.

"Burn Baby Burn" was the first song played on the BBC's 6 Music station.

For release in America, the song was remixed and features a new 'mid-song breakdown' during the final bridge, which reflects the band's live arrangement. "Burn Baby Burn" has been consistently in the band's set since the song's release. As such it appears on the Tokyo Blitz live DVD.

"Burn Baby Burn" was also released as a DVD. The DVD featured the single, acoustic versions of the 1995 single "Girl from Mars" the Free All Angels track "Someday", and "Chinese New Year" - later released as a b-side to "Polaris", and was the first episode of Ash's road movies. Entitled "Episode 1: Road Movie", it lasted 20 minutes and starred the band's usual rockstar antics, ensuring a Parental Guidance sticker for the DVD. The DVD was limited edition, and only 8,000 were produced.

The track was released in a promo EP form in many countries. In Australia, it starred all of the B-sides from the 2CDs released for "Burn Baby Burn", as well as the song itself.

Stephen Merchant spoke with BBC Radio 2's Zoe Ball, where he stated that this was his favourite song of all time.

== B-sides ==
Both of the CD1 B-sides were recorded for BBC Radio 1's Evening Sessions. "13th Floor" is a fast-paced number left over from the "Free All Angels" sessions that also appears on the "Cosmic Debris" B-sides collection.

The second CD1 B-side, "Only in Dreams", is a cover of the final song of Weezer's self-titled debut album, known as "The Blue Album". It is one of Ash's longest songs at just under 8 minutes.

"Thinking About You" appears on the CD2 version of "Burn Baby Burn", as well as on "Cosmic Debris". It is an acoustic song about a distant love.

Finally, the last b-side is a remix of "Free All Angels" track "Submission", written by drummer Rick McMurray.

== Music video ==
The video for "Burn Baby Burn" is directed by Jeff Thomas. It stars the band performing the song while basketball players play around them and cheerleaders dance. The video was shot in Selsdon High School, and starred carefully selected cheerleaders and the London Towers basketball team and Brendan Hanlon. Ash claims it to be one of their favourite videos, and one of the most enjoyable they have shot. The cheerleaders in the video also performed with the band on Top of the Pops.

== Awards ==
The song won several awards, including:

- NME Awards 2002: Best Single
- Q Awards 2002: Best Single
- 91 Suns' Greatest Song of All Time, revealed in December 2020.

== Track listings ==
All tracks written and composed by Tim Wheeler; except where indicated.

CD one

1. "Burn Baby Burn (Radio Edit)"
2. "13th Floor"
3. "Only in Dreams" (Cuomo)

CD two (Enhanced)

1. "Burn Baby Burn (Album Version)"
2. "Thinking About You"
3. "Submission (Arthur Baker Remix)" (McMurray/Wheeler)
4. "Burn Baby Burn" (Video)

DVD

1. "Burn Baby Burn (DVD Audio)"
2. Episode 1- Road Movie
3. "Someday (Acoustic)"
4. "Girl From Mars (Acoustic)"

Australian CD

1. "Burn Baby Burn (Album Version)"
2. "13th Floor"
3. "Only in Dreams" (Cuomo)
4. "Thinking About You"
5. "Submission (Arthur Baker Remix)" (McMurray/Wheeler)

== Charts ==
Chart (2001)	Peak position
Europe (Eurochart Hot 100)	45
Ireland (IRMA)	20
Scottish Singles Sales (Official Charts)	10
UK Singles (Official Charts)	13
UK Indie (Official Charts)	1

== Release history ==
Region	Date	Format(s)	Label(s)	Ref.
United Kingdom	2 April 2001	CD; DVD	Infectious; Home Grown	
United Kingdom	9 April 2001	7-inch vinyl	Infectious; Home Grown	
Japan	11 April 2001	CD (with "Shining Light")	SME	
Australia	21 May 2001	CD	Infectious; Home Grown; Festival Mushroom	
