= Newton Faulkner =

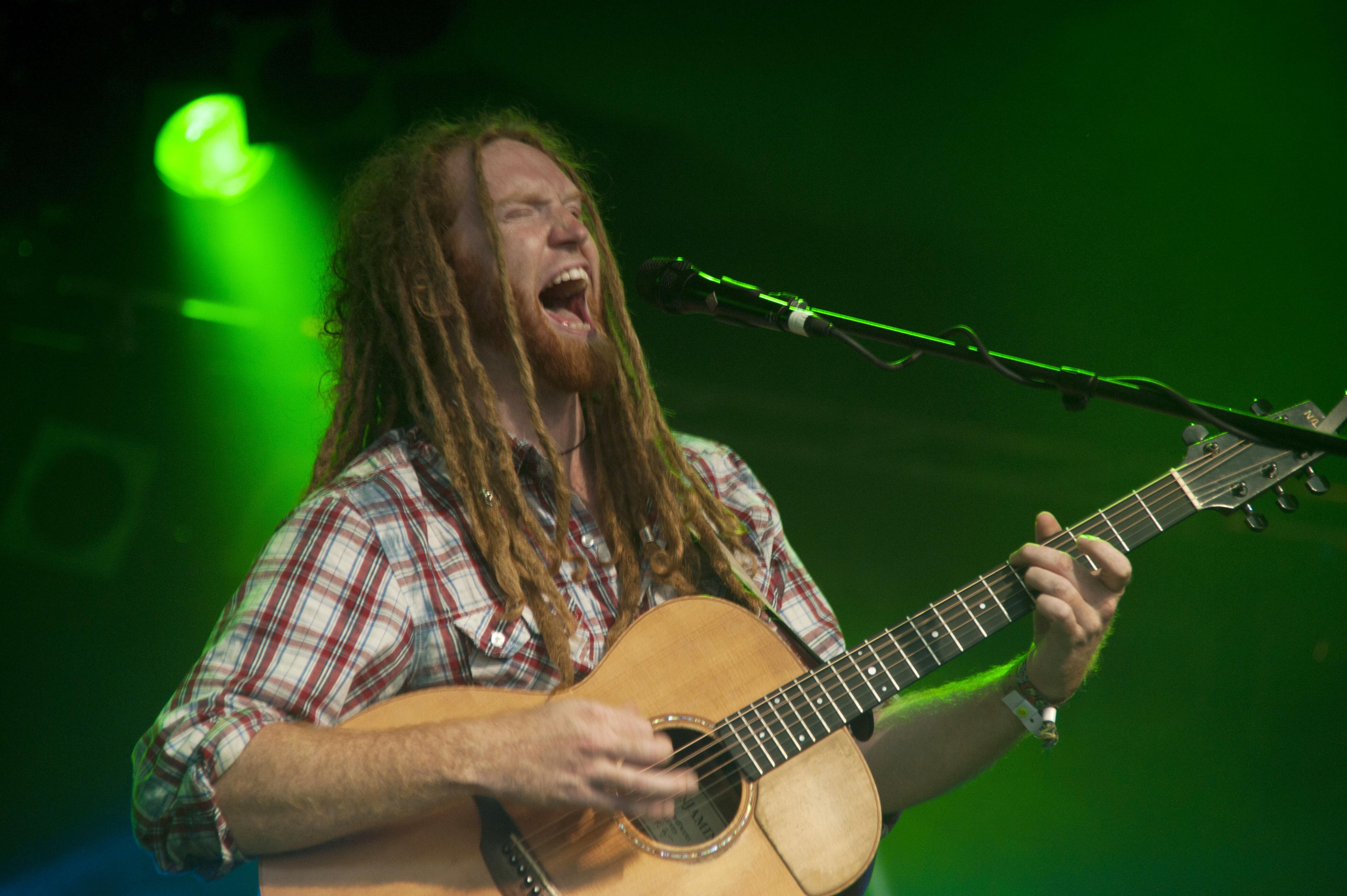
- Faulkner performing in Cambridge in July, 2011

Background information
- Born: Sam Newton Battenberg Faulkner; 11 January 1985 (age 41); Reigate, Surrey, England
- Genres: Folk rock, pop rock, indie rock, acoustic
- Occupations: Musician, songwriter
- Instruments: Vocals, guitar
- Years active: 2006–present
- Labels: Aware Records; Sony BMG; Battenberg Records
- Website: www.newtonfaulkner.com

Sam Newton Battenberg Faulkner (born 11 January 1985) is an English singer-songwriter and musician from Reigate, Surrey. He is known for his percussive style of guitar playing. In 2007 Faulkner's debut studio album Hand Built by Robots was certified double platinum in the United Kingdom. The album topped the UK Albums Chart in August 2007. It was promoted by three singles, "Dream Catch Me", "I Need Something" and "Teardrop". "Dream Catch Me" reached number seven on the UK Singles Charts.

Faulkner's second studio album, Rebuilt by Humans, was released in 2009 and charted at number 3 on the UK Albums Chart. After an accident to his right wrist, he said that he had "been put back together again by humans". An EP titled Sketches was released in April 2012, followed by a third studio album Write It on Your Skin, which was released in July 2012 and reached number one on the UK Albums Chart. Faulkner's fourth album, Studio Zoo, was released in 2013 and reached number ten on the chart; the recording of the album was displayed through a live stream. His fifth studio album, Human Love, was released in November 2015; Faulkner cut off his dreadlocks during the recording of the album to re-invent his appearance.

In 2016, Faulkner was cast as Johnny in the musical American Idiot, which is based on songs from the band Green Day. He played the role on the UK Tour, and continued in the role when the show returned to the West End at the Arts Theatre in July 2016. This was followed by the release of his sixth album, Hit the Ground Running, in 2017. In November and December 2018, Faulkner starred as the Sung Thoughts of the Journalist in the 40th anniversary musical version of Jeff Wayne's War of the Worlds.

In December 2018, a Christmas-themed track called "Wake Up" was previewed on his website to promote the forthcoming release of The Very Best of Newton Faulkner...So Far, featuring 31 songs: selected songs from his six studio albums, three new tracks, and recordings of "all the covers I play live, from 'Bohemian Rhapsody' to 'Send Me on My Way' and a track I promised myself I'd never record!" Faulkner released his seventh album, The Interference (Of Light) in 2021. The album was recorded in isolation during the COVID-19 pandemic and through a live stream, similar to Studio Zoo.

== Early life ==
Faulkner is the second child of Sally and Keith Faulkner. He has an older brother, Toby Faulkner and a younger sister, Charlotte (Lottie) Faulkner. Faulkner attended the Hawthorns School in Bletchingley, Surrey. He began playing guitar at the age of 13 (after a few attempts at the drums and piano) and attended the Italia Conti Academy of Theatre Arts. He grew his trademark red dreadlocks at age 15. He then moved on to the Academy of Contemporary Music in Guildford in 2002, where he spent two years gaining both diploma and the higher diploma award under the tutelage of Eric Roche.

His first band was a Green Day cover band, in which he played bass guitar. His experience on the stage grew as he formed 'Half A Guy', a funk rock group, with bandmates Matt Buchanan (credited in Newton's Hand Built by Robots tab book), Dave Elvy and Nicola Crawshaw. 'Half A Guy' recorded two demo CDs and lasted two years before splitting. He then spent time recording and playing gigs under the name Newton Battenberg Faulkner, including the Lapagestock festival on 11 June 2005.

== Music career ==
=== Hand Built by Robots (2005–2008) ===
In 2005, he made a song for the game 'TrackMania Sunrise' called Take Back.

Faulkner made appearances in 2006 on BBC Radio 2 and he secured a Publishing deal with Peermusic UK who asked the Independent on Sunday to tell its readers to "watch this face". Faulkner performed at the 2006 South by Southwest music festival and at Guilfest 2007.

He subsequently signed with Sony BMG records and in July 2007 he released his début album Hand Built By Robots. He supported James Morrison on his February UK tour, Paolo Nutini on his UK tour in April, and John Mayer on his September dates in the UK. He also supported The John Butler Trio on a number of European dates.

In 2007, Faulkner's debut studio album Hand Built by Robots was certified double platinum in the United Kingdom. Hand Built By Robots made No.1 in the UK Album Chart in August 2007. He released three singles from the album, "Dream Catch Me", "I Need Something" and "Teardrop". "Dream Catch Me" was selected Jo Whiley's Pet Sound on her daily Radio 1 show and made No.7 on the UK Singles Charts. This gave the track exposure and was highly commented on by listeners to Jo's show by SMS and e-mail. On 29 July, "Dream Catch Me" reached No. 7 in the UK Singles Chart. His fourth single from the album, a cover of Massive Attack's "Teardrop", was released in December 2007. A new video for "I Need Something" was released in March along with a United States version of the video for "Dream Catch Me".

Faulkner has performed at several major UK summer music festivals. In 2007 and 2008 he played at Glastonbury Festival, V Festival, Connect Music Festival 2007, at Radio 1's Big Weekend 2008, Lollapalooza 2008 in Grant Park Chicago, Oxegen in Ireland and at the Isle of Wight Festival 2008.

=== Rebuilt by Humans (2009–2011) ===
Faulkner released his second studio album, Rebuilt by Humans, in 2009, which made No.3 UK Albums Chart. On a video blog streamed live from Newton Faulkner's website on 22 June 2009, he stated that the new album would be called Rebuilt By Humans. In December 2008, Faulkner slipped on some ice and badly injured his wrist, into which doctors fitted a metal plate. Effectively, he explained, he had "been put back together again by humans". The first single from the album was "If This Is It" and released in September 2009.

In 2009 Faulkner played at Latitude Festival, Cois Fharraige in the Republic of Ireland, and at the Crossing Border Festival in the Netherlands, which was his last performance for the Rebuilt By Humans launch tour.

In 2010, "Dream Catch Me" was featured in the US film She's Out of My League. In early 2010, Faulkner featured on the Hamish & Andy radio show in Australia, playing "I Hate Mondays" (which Faulkner wrote the music for and which was arranged by Harry Connick Jr and written by Michael "Horgs" Horgan), and this song charted at No.1 on the Australian Apple iTunes Store. Faulkner again performed at several UK festivals – Glastonbury Festival 2010, Oxegen Ireland, T in the Park 2010 in Scotland, Latitude Festival 2010, and the Beautiful Days music festival in Devon. In October 2010, he played a surprise set at the ACM Awards show at Indig02 at the O2 Arena in London and in November 2010, he appeared at the 'Christmas Lights switch-on' in Barnstaple.

Faulkner took part in the 2010-2011 Edinburgh New Year's Hogmanay Celebration.

In 2011 he played at "Movistar Summer Experience" in Pinamar, Argentina in February and at the 'Beach Break Live' in Wales. Faulkner headlined the 'Avebury Rocks Charity Concert' in July 2011, and this event raised money for a Cancer Charity the Love Hope Strength Foundation. In July 2011, he played at the Cambridge Folk Festival. In 2011 Faulkner performed at the Bath Forum as a part of the 'International Guitar Foundation'.

In 2011, a portrait of Faulkner painted by British artist Joe Simpson was exhibited around the UK including a solo exhibition at The Royal Albert Hall.

Also in 2011, his track "Over and Out" was covered by the Irish vocal pop group Westlife and was included in the band's second major compilation album and twelfth major overall album Greatest Hits.

=== Sketches and Write It on Your Skin (2012–2013) ===
An EP named Sketches was released on 17 April 2012 and contained three new tracks. It was taken off iTunes on 21 April 2012, and was updated and re-released on 21 May 2012.

At several shows on his 2012 tour, Faulkner announced that his third studio album would be titled Write It on Your Skin, and a track called "Clouds" would be the album's first single. In June 2012, "Clouds" received BBC Radio 1 airplay. Write It on Your Skin was released on 9 July 2012 and reached number one on the UK Albums Chart.

Faulkner performed two live gigs at Edinburgh's The Edge Festival in August 2012 with Reverieme. In September he played at Weyfest. In the Autumn of 2012, Newton and his brother Toby co-wrote several tracks with Janet Devlin for her upcoming debut album.

In 2012, Faulkner played a UK wide tour for his album Write It on Your Skin, and in 2013 he toured Australia.

=== Studio Zoo (2013–2014) ===
The recording of Faulkner's fourth album Studio Zoo was being streamed live online, 24/7 for five weeks from 11 June 2013, with regular updates on the social networks. His home studio in East London was set up with four cameras, to follow every detail of recording the album..

I am as excited as I am terrified by the prospect of having a house full of cameras film me while trying to record an album. The entire recording process will be streamed live and nothing has been recorded in advance – apart from some particularly good hand claps recorded in Paris. The album will be made before your very eyes, no tricks, no producer and no engineer, just me, a guitar and a few surprise guests.

On 16 June 2013 Faulkner played the main stage at the Isle of Wight Festival 2013 with live streaming as part of the Studio Zoo project. He played "Dream Catch Me", "I Need Something", "Brick by Brick", "Orange Skies" and a cover of Queen's "Bohemian Rhapsody", among others.

The album Studio Zoo was released on 26 August 2013. It debuted at no. 10 at UK Albums Chart, becoming Faulkner's fourth top 10 studio album.

=== Human Love (2015) ===
Faulkner's fifth studio album, Human Love, was released on 20 November 2015. A music video for the album's lead single, a cover of Major Lazer's song "Get Free", was released the same day and featured a live take of Newton cutting off the long dreadlocks that had been a part of his instantly recognisable image since his teens. A second single, "Up Up and Away", was subsequently released and accompanied by a video featuring choreographed dance routines performed while Newton jogged along a river bank.

=== Hit the Ground Running (2017) ===
Newton's sixth studio album was released on 1 September 2017. The opening track "Smoked Ice Cream" is a track that he had played live for years that had no title until a suggestion was shouted out from a crowd at a gig Shortly before the release of Hit The Ground Running, Newton recorded an acoustic version of the full Hand Built by Robots album, and released it on YouTube as a video album, showing him playing each song in a different setting in and around his house with each song segueing into the next in the same way and in the same order as the original record.

== Discography ==
- Hand Built by Robots (2007)
- Rebuilt by Humans (2009)
- Write It on Your Skin (2012)
- Studio Zoo (2013)
- Human Love (2015)
- Hit the Ground Running (2017)
- Interference (Of Light) (2021)
- Octopus (2025)

== Filmography ==
- 2010: Relentless Boardmasters (TV series)
- 2011: You Instead
- 2018: Terminal
- 2019: YolanDa's Band Jam (Guest Appearance – Groovy Guitar)
