= Gabrielle Aplin discography =

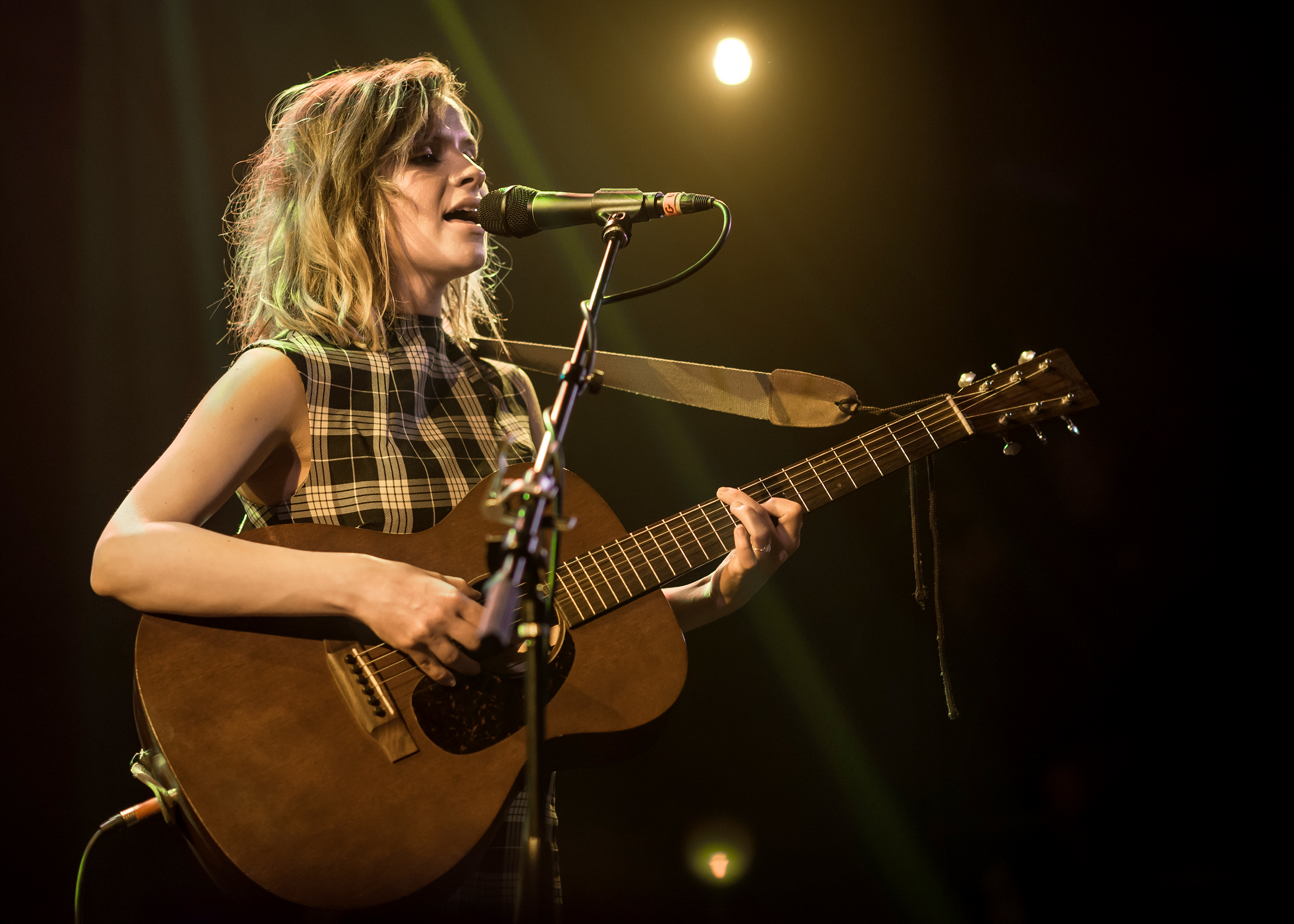
- Gabrielle Aplin performing at The Troubadour in Los Angeles, California, 10 March 2018.
- Studio albums: 4
- EPs: 7
- Live albums: 3
- Singles: 19
- Music videos: 15

The discography of British singer Gabrielle Aplin, consists of four studio albums, 17 extended plays, three live albums and 20 singles. Her first release was the 5-track Acoustic EP which was released on the iTunes Store on 13 September 2010. Her second EP Never Fade was released on 9 May 2011 and saw Aplin expand her sound, showcasing a more folk rock sound and playing all instruments herself. In April 2011, Aplin was invited to perform for BBC Introducing at Maida Vale Studios, where she played 3 tracks from Never Fade and a cover of the Coldplay song "Fix You". Aplin released her third EP, Home, on 9 January 2012. On 29 February 2012, Aplin announced that she had signed to Parlophone. Aplin was confirmed as the soundtrack to the John Lewis 2012 Christmas television advertisement, covering Frankie Goes to Hollywood's "The Power of Love", the song reached number one on the UK Singles Chart.

On 12 December 2012, Aplin announced that the title of her debut album would be English Rain. In addition, she also unveiled its artwork and release date of 29 April 2013. However, the album's release date was later confirmed as 13 May 2013. Aplin announced live on 17 February Radio 1 Chart Show that her third single would be "Panic Cord". The song originally featured on her Never Fade EP and it was released on 5 May 2013, charting at number 19 on the UK Singles Chart. English Rain charted at number 2 on both the UK Albums Chart and Scottish Albums Chart, while reaching number on the Irish Albums Chart. In 2014, Aplin released her English Rain EP in the United States. The EP was released on 6 May and features 5 songs from her debut album, as well as a cover of Canadian singer Joni Mitchell's "A Case of You". In 2015, Aplin released her second studio album entitled Light Up the Dark. Light Up the Dark debuted at number 14 on the UK Albums Chart.

== Albums ==
=== Studio albums ===
Title	Details	Peak chart positions							Certifications
Title	Details	UK	AUS	BEL	IRE	NZ	SPA	SCO	Certifications
English Rain	Released: 13 May 2013; Label: Parlophone; Format: CD, LP, digital download	2	10	55	11	39	33	2	BPI: Gold; ARIA: Gold
Light Up the Dark	Released: 18 September 2015; Label: Parlophone; Format: CD, LP, digital download	14	38	166	41	—	—	15	
Dear Happy	Released: 17 January 2020; Label: Never Fade, AWAL; Format: CD, LP, digital download	24	— (Note: Dear Happy did not enter the ARIA Albums Chart, but peaked at number 18 on the ARIA Digital Album Chart.)	—	—	—	—	15	
Phosphorescent	Released: 6 January 2023; Label: Never Fade; Format: CD, LP, digital download	15	—	—	—	—	—	3	
"—" denotes an album that did not chart or was not released.

=== Live albums ===
Title	Details
Gabrielle Aplin: iTunes Festival 2012	Released: 17 September 2012; Label: Parlophone; Format: Digital download
Gabrielle Aplin: Live at Koko	Released: 1 May 2013; Label: Parlophone; Format: Digital download
Gabrielle Aplin: iTunes Festival 2013	Released: 7 October 2013; Label: Parlophone; Format: Digital download

== Extended plays ==
Title	Details
Acoustic	Released: 13 September 2010; Label: Never Fade; Format: Digital download, limited CD copies
Never Fade	Released: 9 May 2011; Label: Never Fade; Format: Digital download, limited CD copies
Home	Released: 9 January 2012; Label: Never Fade; Format: Digital download, limited CD copies
English Rain	Released: 6 May 2014 (US); Label: Never Fade, Warner Bros.; Format: Digital download, limited CD copies
Miss You	Released: 16 December 2016; Label: Never Fade; Format: Digital download, limited CD & vinyl copies
Avalon	Released: 6 October 2017; Label: Never Fade; Format: Digital download, limited CD copies
December (with Hannah Grace)	Released: 4 December 2018; Label: Never Fade; Format: Digital download
Phosphorescent Extended	Released: 7 July 2023; Label: Never Fade; Format: Digital download
Writers Block Pt 1	Released: 18 April 2024; Label: Never Fade; Format: Digital download
Northern Star	Released: 21 March 2025; Label: Never Fade; Format: Digital download

== Singles ==
=== As lead artist ===
Title	Year	Peak chart positions							Certifications	Album
Title	Year	UK	AUS	AUT	BEL (Fl)	IRE	NZ Hot	SCO	Certifications	Album
"The Power of Love"	2012	1	5	75	44	20	—	3	BPI: Platinum; ARIA: Platinum	English Rain
"Please Don't Say You Love Me"	2013	6	3	—	48	27	—	5	BPI: Gold; ARIA: Platinum	English Rain
"Panic Cord"	2013	19	—	—	60	77	—	19		English Rain
"Home"	2013	48	—	—	—	—	—	—	BPI: Silver	English Rain
"Salvation"	2014	122	60	—	—	—	—	—		English Rain
"Light Up the Dark"	2015	—	—	—	—	—	—	—		Light Up the Dark
"Sweet Nothing"	2015	178	—	—	—	—	—	63		Light Up the Dark
"Miss You"	2016	— (Note: "Miss You" did not enter the UK Singles Chart, but peaked at number 52 on the UK Download Chart.)	—	—	—	—	—	47		Miss You
"Waking Up Slow"	2017	— (Note: "Waking Up Slow" did not enter the UK Singles Chart, but peaked at number 69 on the UK Download Chart.)	—	—	—	—	—	51		Avalon
"My Mistake"	2018	—	—	—	—	—	—	—		Dear Happy
"Nothing Really Matters"	2019	—	—	—	—	—	—	—		Dear Happy
"Losing Me" (with JP Cooper)	2019	—	—	—	—	—	31	—		Dear Happy
"Miss You 2" (with Nina Nesbitt)	2020	—	—	—	—	—	30	—		Non-album singles
"Good Days Bad Days" (with Anna Straker)	2020	—	—	—	—	—	—	—		Non-album singles
"When the Lights Go Out"	2020	—	—	—	—	—	34	—		Non-album singles
"Just Like Christmas"	2021	—	—	—	—	—	—	—		Non-album singles
"Skylight"	2021	—	—	—	—	—	—	—		Phosphorescent
"Call Me"	2022	—	—	—	—	—	—	—		Phosphorescent
"Don't Know What I Want"	2022	—	—	—	—	—	—	—		Phosphorescent
"Never Be the Same"	2022	—	—	—	—	—	—	—		Phosphorescent
"Don't Say"	2022	—	—	—	—	—	—	—		Phosphorescent
"Side By Side" (featuring Hugh Laurie)	2022	—	—	—	—	—	—	—		The Amazing Maurice
"Good Enough"	2022	—	—	—	—	—	—	—		Phosphorescent
"Anyway" (with Gavin James)	2023	—	—	—	—	—	—	—		Phosphorescent Extended
"Just Because I'm Okay"	2023	—	—	—	—	—	—	—		Phosphorescent Extended
"Fake Plastic Trees"	2023	—	—	—	—	—	—	—		Writers Block Pt 1
"Place Your Hands"	2024	—	—	—	—	—	—	—		Writers Block Pt 1
"My Hero"	2024	—	—	—	—	—	—	—		Writers Block Pt 1
"If It Makes You Happy"	2024	—	—	—	—	—	—	—		Writers Block Pt 1
"Lost Without You" (with Kidnap)	2024	—	—	—	—	—	—	—		Something Lost, Something Gained
"Go Be Free"	2024	—	—	—	—	—	—	—		Northern Star
"Home to Me"	2025	—	—	—	—	—	—	—		Northern Star
"Magnolia"	2025	—	—	—	—	—	—	—		Northern Star
"Little Light" (with Alfie Hudson-Taylor)	2025	—	—	—	—	—	—	—		Northern Star
"Ghost in My Machine" (with Mia Wray)	2025	—	—	—	—	—	—	—		Hi, It's Nice to Meet Me
"Somebody" (with Super Hi)	2026	—	—	—	—	—	—	—		Non-album single
"—" denotes a single that did not chart or was not released.

=== As featured artist ===
Title	Year	Album
"That Girl" (Salute featuring Gabrielle Aplin)	2017	Non-album singles
"Dream Enough" (George Kwali featuring Gabrielle Aplin)	2018	Non-album singles
"Change" (Tsha featuring Gabrielle Aplin)	2020	Flowers
"Imagining" (Michael Calfan featuring Gabrielle Aplin)	2021	Non-album single
"That's Exactly What Love Is" (The Coronas featuring Gabrielle Aplin)	2024	Thoughts & Observation

== Other appearances ==
Title	Year	Other artists	Album
"Dreams"	2012	Bastille	Other People's Heartache Pt. II
"Droplets"	2013	Lewis Watson	Some Songs with Some Friends
"Feet on the Ground"	2016	Fono	Kinetic EP
"Dancing in the Dark"	2019	Trevor Horn, The Sarm Orchestra	Reimagines the Eighties
"Everyone Changes"	2020	Kodaline	One Day At A Time (Deluxe Edition)
"Circles"	2023	Passenger	All The Little Lights (Anniversary Edition)

== Music videos ==
Title	Year	Ref.
"The Power of Love"	2012	
"Please Don't Say You Love Me"	2012	
"Panic Cord"	2013	
"Home"	2013	
"Salvation"	2013	
"Light Up the Dark"	2015	
"Sweet Nothing"	2015	
"Miss You"	2016	
"Waking Up Slow"	2017	
"My Mistake"	2018	
"Nothing Really Matters"	2019	
"Kintsugi"	2019	
"Losing Me"	2019	
"Like You Say You Do"	2019	
"Miss You 2"	2020	
