= Miss You 2 =

Single by Gabrielle Aplin and Nina Nesbitt

from the album Dear Happy (Japan Edition)
- Released: 3 January 2020
- Length: 3:16
- Label: Never Fade; AWAL
- Songwriters: Liz Horsman, Gabrielle Aplin, Nina Nesbitt
- Producers: Liz Horsman, Mike Spencer

Gabrielle Aplin singles chronology
"Losing Me" (2019)	"Miss You 2" (2020)	"Good Days Bad Days" (2020)

Nina Nesbitt singles chronology
"Together Forever" (2020)	"Miss You 2" (2020)	"Cry Dancing" (2020)

"Miss You 2" is a song by English singer-songwriter Gabrielle Aplin and Scottish singer-songwriter Nina Nesbitt, released on 3 January 2020 through Never Fade Records and AWAL. The song was later included on the Japan edition of Aplin's third studio album, Dear Happy (2020).

== Background ==
The song is a new version of 2016's "Miss You". Aplin and Nesbitt have been long-term friends and a collaboration is something that both fans and the artists have wanted for years. When talking about the song, Nesbitt said, "I'm so excited to be featuring on Gabrielle's new version of 'Miss You'. We have known each other for a long time and one of my first ever gigs was supporting her at a gig in 2011. I've always been a big fan of her work and I'm so happy we've finally had the chance to collaborate." Aplin said, "I'm so happy to have Nina on 'Miss You'. We came through as artists around the same time. We have been of both sides of an ever-changing industry and both decided to independently take control of our careers and success. The initial release of 'Miss You' feels like the start of that for me, and I'm thrilled that Nina has added her voice to a new version of one of my favourite songs of mine."

== Music video ==
The music video is based around a lesbian couple who have broken up and are now dating Aplin and Nesbitt, respectively, while still not being over each other. The music video is opened and features transitions with Aplin and Nesbitt singing together.

The storyline starts with Aplin sitting with her date in silence in a car. The video then jumps to Aplin sitting opposite her date in a café looking frustrated, noticing her date has zoned out and is not paying attention to her. It's revealed her date is thinking about her ex-girlfriend, and the scene cuts to a flashback of her with her ex on a date in the same place together, enjoying themselves. The video then jumps back to the present, where the girl is sitting by herself, after Aplin has decided to leave.

The next scene shows Nesbitt with the second girl, having an argument. The girl then thinks about the past, where it's shown in another flashback that she was kissing her ex-girlfriend in the same place she is arguing with Nesbitt now. The girl then looks into the distance alone, suggesting Nesbitt has left her there. Later, Nesbitt reappears, but the girl is texting her ex-partner. Nesbitt smiles, suggesting the girl has her blessing to reunite with her ex-lover.

The text on the phone from the second girl to her ex-lover is revealed to say "miss you". However, the first girl doesn't see it, as she's left the phone on a table in the café in which she was with Aplin at the start of the video.

The first girl is then shown having a breakdown over her ex, with Aplin comforting her, suggesting that she knows her date isn't over her ex and has chosen to support her.

The video ends with the second girl exiting a doorway, wondering whether she will ever hear back from her.

== Charts ==
Chart (2020)	Peak position
New Zealand Hot Singles (RMNZ)	30

== Release history ==
Region	Date	Format	Label
United Kingdom	3 January 2020	Digital download; streaming	Never Fade; AWAL
