= Light Up the Dark (album) =

Studio album by Gabrielle Aplin
- Released: 18 September 2015
- Genre: Indie rock; indie pop; baroque pop; neo soul; indie folk
- Length: 49:58
- Label: Parlophone
- Producer: Luke Potashnick

Gabrielle Aplin chronology
English Rain EP (2014)	Light Up the Dark (2015)	Miss You (2016)

Gabrielle Aplin studio album chronology
English Rain (2013)	Light Up the Dark (2015)	Dear Happy (2020)

Singles from Light Up the Dark
- 1. "Light Up the Dark" Released: 18 May 2015; 2. "Sweet Nothing" Released: 6 August 2015

Light Up the Dark is the second studio album by English singer-songwriter Gabrielle Aplin, which was released by Parlophone Records on 18 September 2015. The album peaked at number fourteen in the UK Albums Chart.

== Singles ==
"Light Up the Dark" was the album's first single and the music video was released on 18 May 2015. The second single was "Sweet Nothing" which was released on 6 August 2015.

== Track listing ==
Light Up the Dark — Standard edition
No.	Title	Writer(s)	Producer(s)	Length
1.	"Light Up the Dark"	Gabrielle Aplin; Luke Potashnick	Potashnick	4:16
2.	"Skeleton"	Aplin; Potashnick; Adam Argyle	Potashnick	3:37
3.	"Fools Love"	Aplin; Potashnick	Potashnick	4:05
4.	"Slip Away"	Aplin; Nick Atkinson	Atkinson; Edd Holloway	3:52
5.	"Sweet Nothing"	Aplin; Potashnick; Charlotte O'Connor	Potashnick	2:53
6.	"Heavy Heart"	Aplin; Potashnick	Potashnick	3:55
7.	"Shallow Love"	Aplin; Potashnick; Sacha Skarbek	Potashnick	3:59
8.	"Anybody Out There"	Aplin; Matt Prime; Wayne Hector	Prime	3:09
9.	"Hurt"	Aplin; Potashnick; Argyle	Potashnick	4:13
10.	"Together"	Aplin; Potashnick; Starbek	Potashnick	2:45
11.	"What Did You Do?"	Aplin; Potashnick; Argyle	Potashnick	4:21
12.	"A While"	Aplin; Potashnick	Potashnick	4:23
13.	"Don't Break Your Heart On Me" (Hidden track)	Aplin; Potashnick; Alfie Hudson-Taylor		4:30
Total length:				49:58

Light Up the Dark — Deluxe edition (bonus tracks)
No.	Title	Writer(s)	Length
13.	"Don't Break Your Heart On Me"	Aplin; Potashnick; Hudson-Taylor	3:00
14.	"This Side of the Moon"	Aplin; Potashnick	4:10
15.	"Coming Home"	Aplin; John Smith; Lisa Hannigan	3:34
16.	"Letting You Go"	Aplin; Cass Lowe; Jimmy Lowe	3:09
17.	"The House We Never Built"	Aplin; Atkinson; Tom Wilding	3:15
18.	"You Don't Like Dancing"	Aplin; Potashnick; Starbek	3:35
Total length:			66:11

Light Up the Dark — Japanese edition (bonus tracks)
No.	Title	Writer(s)	Length
13.	"Don't Break Your Heart On Me"	Aplin; Potashnick; Alfie Hudson-Taylor	4:30
14.	"A Case of You"	Joni Mitchell	4:21
15.	"Predictable"	Aplin	3:58
Total length:			74:30

== Personnel ==
Musicians

- Gabrielle Aplin – vocals, piano, Hammond organ, pipe organ, Juno, electric guitar, acoustic guitar, flute
- Adam Argyle – guitar, harpsichord, piano, background vocals
- Nick Atkinson – guitar, background vocals
- Karl Brazil – stick
- Richard Causon – harmonium, Hammond organ
- Adam Falkner – drums, percussion
- Hannah Grace – screams, background vocals
- Tim Harries – double bass
- Jimmy Hogarth – bass, drums, guitar, keyboards, percussion, programming
- Edd Holloway – keyboards
- Alfie Hudson-Taylor – background vocals
- Harry Hudson-Taylor – background vocals
- Cass Lowe – piano
- Charlotte O'Connor – background vocals
- Luke Potashnick – bass, Casio, acoustic guitar, electric guitar, Juno, Mellotron, Moog bass, percussion, Space Echo guitar, string samples, synthesizer, background vocals
- Matt Prime – bass, guitar, piano
- Sacha Skarbeck – piano, background vocals
- Nikolaj Torp Larsen – glockenspiel, Juno, Moog bass, Hammond organ, piano, Wurlitzer
- Tadhg Walsh-Peelo – string section
- Tom Wilding – baritone, bass, drums, flugelhorn, electric guitar, percussion, piano, trombone, trumpet, background vocals
- Damon Wilson – bongos, cymbals, drums

Production

- Greg Calbi – mastering
- Adam Cole – engineer
- Eduardo De La Paz – mixing, mixing assistant
- Steve Fallone – mastering
- Edd Holloway – producer
- Sam Miller – vocal engineer
- Luke Potashnick – producer
- Matt Prime – producer
- Gabrielle Aplin – liner notes

== Charts ==
Chart (2015)	Peak position
Australian Albums (ARIA)	38
Belgian Albums (Ultratop Flanders)	171
Belgian Albums (Ultratop Wallonia)	166
Irish Albums (IRMA)	41
UK Albums (OCC)	14
Scottish Albums (OCC)	15
