= Never Fade =

Never Fade may refer to:

- "Never Fade" (song), a 2018 song by Alice in Chains
- Never Fade (EP), a 2011 EP by Gabrielle Aplin, or the title song
  - Never Fade Records, record label founded by Aplin
