= Losing Me =

Single by Gabrielle Aplin and JP Cooper

from the album Dear Happy
- Released: 14 August 2019
- Length: 3:00
- Label: Never Fade; AWAL
- Songwriter(s): Aplin; Matthew Prime; Mike Spencer; Nataniel Cyphert
- Producer(s): Lostboy; Mike Spencer

Gabrielle Aplin singles chronology
"Nothing Really Matters" (2019)	"Losing Me" (2019)	"Miss You 2" (2020)

JP Cooper singles chronology
"We Were Young" (2019)	"Losing Me" (2019)	"The Reason Why" (2019)

"Losing Me" is a song by British singers Gabrielle Aplin and JP Cooper, released through Never Fade Records and AWAL on 14 August 2019 as the third single from the former's third studio album, Dear Happy (2020).

== Background ==
On 8 August 2019, Aplin announced the release of her new single on social media. The song was produced by Lostboy and Mike Spencer. Talking about the song, Aplin said, "Losing Me is about what you wish you could hear when you're having a particularly hard time, while also being that voice to someone else who needs it. It's about remaining connected when there is so much in modern life that can give the illusion of oneness whilst making us feel more alone. I've been a huge fan of JP Cooper for years and I'm so happy he agreed to be on this song with me. I saw JP play an acoustic set at a festival three years ago I've wanted to work with him ever since."

== Music video ==
A music video to accompany the release of "Losing Me" was first released onto YouTube on 15 August 2019. Aplin said that the inspiration behind the video is how in the modern world, even when we're surrounded by people and things we can still feel desensitised and disconnected from everything going on.

== Charts ==
Chart (2019)	Peak position
New Zealand Hot Singles (RMNZ)	31

== Release history ==
Region	Date	Format	Label
United Kingdom	14 August 2019	Digital download; streaming	Never Fade; AWAL
