= Kintsugi (disambiguation) =

Kintsugi is the Japanese art of repairing broken pottery with lacquer dusted or mixed with powdered gold, silver, or platinum.

Kintsugi may also refer to:

- Kintsugi (album), a 2015 album by Death Cab for Cutie
- "Kintsugi", a 2019 song by Gabrielle Aplin from the album Dear Happy
- "Kintsugi", a 2023 song by Lana Del Rey from the album Did You Know That There's a Tunnel Under Ocean Blvd
