= My Mistake (Gabrielle Aplin song) =

2018 single by Gabrielle Aplin

Single by Gabrielle Aplin

from the album Dear Happy
- Released: 28 November 2018
- Length: 4:25
- Label: Never Fade; AWAL
- Songwriters: Gabrielle Aplin; Olivia Sebastianelli; Ash Howes; Seton Daunt
- Producers: Howes; Daunt

Gabrielle Aplin singles chronology
"Dream Enough" (2018)	"My Mistake" (2018)	"Nothing Really Matters" (2019)

Music video
- "My Mistake" on YouTube

"My Mistake" is a song by English singer-songwriter Gabrielle Aplin, released on 28 November 2018 by Never Fade Records and AWAL as the lead single from her third studio album, Dear Happy (2020). Aplin co-wrote the song with Olivia Sebastianelli, alongside its producers Ash Howes and Seton Daunt. "My Mistake" is a piano ballad, with lyrics describing "embracing your flaws".

== Background ==
In Atwood Magazine, Aplin described the song as a result of "gather[ing] [her] thoughts and liv[ing] life a little bit." She also described the writing process as "surprisingly easy."

== Release ==
The song was premiered on Billboard.

It was the first release in a partnership between AWAL and Aplin's Never Fade Records.

== Music video ==
The song's music video features Aplin performing ballet in an apartment.

== Track listing ==
Digital download
No.	Title	Length
1.	"My Mistake (Rework)"	3:29
2.	"My Mistake"	4:25
3.	"My Mistake (Piano Version)"	4:52
4.	"My Mistake (Acoustic)"	4:33

== Release history ==
Region	Date	Format	Label
United Kingdom	28 November 2018	Digital download	Never Fade; AWAL
