= Never Fade (EP) =

2011 EP by Gabrielle Aplin

EP by Gabrielle Aplin
- Released: 9 May 2011
- Length: 13:38
- Label: Never Fade
- Producer: Mike Spencer; Jez Ashurst; Charlie Westropp; Luke Potashnick

Gabrielle Aplin chronology
Acoustic (2010)	Never Fade (2011)	Home (2012)

Never Fade is the second extended play (EP) by English singer-songwriter Gabrielle Aplin. The EP was self-released by Aplin on 9 May 2011. It was then re-released by the record label which Aplin founded, Never Fade Records, on 12 February 2013. The EP includes the original version of the song "Panic Cord", which was re-recorded and included on Aplin's debut studio album English Rain.

== Track listing ==
No.	Title	Writer(s)	Producer(s)	Length
1.	"Never Fade"	Gabrielle Aplin; Mike Spencer	Spencer	3:13
2.	"Lying to the Mirror"	Aplin; Charlie Westropp; Nick Atkinson	Westropp	2:59
3.	"Panic Cord"	Aplin; Jez Ashurst; Atkinson	Ashurst	3:22
4.	"Puzzle Piece"	Aplin; Luke Benjamin Potashnick	Potashnick	4:04
Total length:				13:38
