= Miss You (Gabrielle Aplin song) =

Single by Gabrielle Aplin

from the EP Miss You and the album Dear Happy
- Released: 9 November 2016
- Length: 3:17
- Label: Never Fade
- Songwriter(s): Gabrielle Aplin; Liz Horsman
- Producer(s): Mike Spencer; Liz Horsman

Gabrielle Aplin singles chronology
"Sweet Nothing" (2015)	"Miss You" (2016)	"Waking Up Slow" (2017)

Music video
- "Miss You" on YouTube

"Miss You" is a song by English singer-songwriter Gabrielle Aplin. It was released through Aplin's record label Never Fade Records on 9 November 2016, as the lead single from her fifth extended play of the same name. The song was written by Aplin and Liz Horsman, and produced by Mike Spencer and Horsman.

== Music video ==
A music video to accompany the release of "Miss You" was first released onto YouTube on 21 November 2016.

== Charts ==
Chart (2016)	Peak position
Scotland (OCC)	47
UK Singles Downloads (OCC)	52

== Release history ==
Region	Date	Format	Label
United Kingdom	9 November 2016	Digital download	Never Fade Records
