= Sweet Nothings =

Sweet Nothings or Sweet Nothing may refer to:

== Film and theater ==
- Sweet Nothing (film), a 1995 American film directed by Gary Winick
- Sweet Nothings, a 2010 adaptation by David Harrower of the 1894 play Liebelei by Arthur Schnitzler
- Sweet Nothings, a upcoming 2027 British film written and directed by Toby Kearton

== Music ==
- Sweet Nothings (group), an all-female a capella group at Exeter University

=== Albums ===
- Sweet Nothing (album), by Tex Perkins' Dark Horses, 2003
- Sweet Nothing, by Sonic's Rendezvous Band, 1999
- Sweet Nothings (album), by Dog Fashion Disco, or the title song, 2014
- Sweet Nothings, by Plini, 2013

=== Songs ===
- "Sweet Nothing" (Calvin Harris song), 2012
- "Sweet Nothing" (Gabrielle Aplin song), 2015
- "Sweet Nothing" (Taylor Swift song), 2022
- "Sweet Nothing", by Natasha Bedingfield from Roll with Me, 2019
- "Sweet Nothing", by Working Week from Working Nights, 1985
- "Sweet Nothin'", by Bug Hunter from Torn Between a Couple, 2017
- "Sweet Nothin's", by Brenda Lee, 1959
- "Sweet Nothing's", by Ai from Wa to Yo, 2017
- "Sweet Nothings", by Loudon Wainwright III from Unrequited, 1975
- "Sweet Nothings", by Neck Deep from Wishful Thinking, 2014
- “Sweet Nothings”, by Nieve Ella, 2024

== See also ==
- "Oh! Sweet Nuthin'", a 1970 song by the Velvet Underground
- Flirting
