= Miss You (EP) =

2016 EP by Gabrielle Aplin

EP by Gabrielle Aplin
- Released: 16 December 2016
- Length: 14:05
- Label: Never Fade
- Producer: Mike Spencer; Liz Horsman; Nick Atkinson; Edd Holloway

Gabrielle Aplin chronology
English Rain (2014)	Miss You (2016)	Avalon (2017)

Singles from Miss You
- 1. "Miss You" Released: 9 November 2016

Miss You is the fifth extended play (EP) by English singer-songwriter Gabrielle Aplin. It was released on 16 December 2016 through Aplin's record label, Never Fade Records. The EP was supported by the lead single and title track, "Miss You", released on 9 November 2016.

== Track listing ==
No.	Title	Writer(s)	Producer(s)	Length
1.	"Miss You"	Gabrielle Aplin; Liz Horsman	Mike Spencer; Horsman	3:17
2.	"Night Bus"	Aplin; Horsman	Horsman	3:41
3.	"Run for Cover"	Aplin; Nick Atkinson; Edd Holloway	Atkinson; Holloway	3:34
4.	"Miss You" (piano version)	Aplin; Horsman	Spencer; Horsman	3:33
Total length:				14:05
