= Nothing Really Matters (disambiguation) =

"Nothing Really Matters" is a 1999 single by Madonna.

Nothing Really Matters may also refer to:

- "Nothing Really Matters" (Becky Hill and Tiësto song)
- "Nothing Really Matters" (Gabrielle Aplin song)
- "Nothing Really Matters" (Mr. Probz song)
- "Nothing Really Matters", a song by David Guetta featuring will.i.am from Nothing but the Beat
- "Nothing Really Matters", a storyline in the science fiction comedy webtoon series Live with Yourself!
