= Waking Up Slow =

Song by English singer-songwriter Gabrielle Aplin

Single by Gabrielle Aplin

from the EP Avalon
- Released: 9 August 2017
- Length: 3:24
- Label: Never Fade
- Songwriters: Gabrielle Aplin; Peter Rycroft
- Producer: Lostboy

Gabrielle Aplin singles chronology
"Miss You" (2016)	"Waking Up Slow" (2017)	"That Girl" (2017)

Music video
- "Waking Up Slow" on YouTube

"Waking Up Slow" is a song by English singer-songwriter Gabrielle Aplin. It was released through Aplin's record label Never Fade Records on 9 August 2017, as the lead single from her sixth extended play (EP), Avalon. The song was written by Aplin and Peter Rycroft, and produced by Lostboy. The song was released as a piano version on 1 September 2017.

== Music video ==
The music video for the song was released on 22 September 2017 via YouTube, and was directed by Charlotte Rutherford.

== Charts ==
Chart (2017)	Peak position
Scotland Singles (OCC)	51
UK Singles Downloads (OCC)	69

== Release history ==
Region	Date	Format	Label	Ref.
United Kingdom	9 August 2017	Digital download; streaming	Never Fade Records	
