= What Am I Fighting For? =

2007 single by Unklejam

Single by Unklejam

from the album Unklejam
- Released: 4 June 2007
- Length: 3:43 (album version); 3:27 (radio edit)
- Label: Virgin
- Songwriters: Mike Spencer; Donovan Tendai Tyson; Angeline Bell
- Producer: Mike Spencer

Unklejam singles chronology
"Love Ya" (2007)	"What Am I Fighting For?" (2007)	"Stereo" (2007)

Alternative cover
- UK CD2 single cover

"What Am I Fighting For?" is the second single by British dance music band Unklejam, released in 2007 from their self-titled debut album. The song reached No. 16 on the UK Singles Chart.

The single was met with positive reviews from critics and was playlisted by BBC Radio 1, Galaxy, Kiss, Capital FM and The Mix ad, leading the single to be a radio hit, peaking in the top 30 of the UK airplay chart and the top 20 of the UK TV airplay chart.

== Track listings ==
UK CD1

1. "What Am I Fighting For?" (radio edit)
2. "Ain't No Sunshine"

UK CD2

1. "What Am I Fighting For?" (album version)
2. "What Am I Fighting For?" (original mix)
3. "What Am I Fighting For?" (Steve Mac remix)
4. "What Am I Fighting For?" (The Record Shack mix)
5. "What Am I Fighting For?" (video/behind the scenes)

UK 7-inch picture disc

A. "What Am I Fighting For?" (radio edit)
B. "What Am I Fighting For?" (L.A. Priest remix)

== Charts ==
Chart (2007)	Peak position
Scottish Singles Sales (Official Charts)	24
UK Singles (Official Charts)	16
