= Salvation (Gabrielle Aplin song) =

Single by Gabrielle Aplin

from the album English Rain
- Released: 12 January 2014
- Recorded: 2012–13
- Genre: Pop
- Length: 4:10
- Label: Parlophone
- Songwriter(s): Gabrielle Aplin; Joel Pott
- Producer(s): Mike Spencer

Gabrielle Aplin singles chronology
"Home" (2013)	"Salvation" (2014)	"Light Up the Dark" (2015)

"Salvation" is a song recorded by British singer-songwriter Gabrielle Aplin and released as the fifth single from her debut studio album English Rain (2013). The song was released in the United Kingdom as a digital download on 12 January 2014 through Parlophone. The song peaked at number 122 on the UK Singles Chart, the song has also peaked at number 60 in Australia. The song was featured in the second trailer to the animated film The Little Prince (2015), and an instrumental is regularly used in the final scene of the British version cooking competition series MasterChef.

A remix with HEYHEY was released on 12 February 2016.

== Music video ==
A music video to accompany the release of "Salvation" was first released onto YouTube on 2 December 2013 at a total length of four minutes and six seconds.

== Track listing ==
Digital download
No.	Title	Length
1.	"Salvation"	4:10

== Chart performance ==
Chart (2014)	Peak position
Australia (ARIA)	60
UK Singles (The Official Charts Company)	122

== Release history ==
Region	Date	Format	Label
United Kingdom	12 January 2014	Digital download	Parlophone
