= Hannah Grace =

British singer

- Born: Hannah Vivian-Byrne; 4 June 1993 (age 33)
- Origin: Cardiff, Wales
- Genres: Soul; pop; jazz
- Occupation: Singer
- Instruments: Vocals; piano
- Years active: 2014–present
- Label: Never Fade
- Website: hangracemusic.com

Hannah Vivian-Byrne, known professionally as Hannah Grace (born 4 June 1993) is a Welsh singer.

Her debut studio album, Remedy, was released on 20 November 2020.

== History ==
Grace studied Jazz Vocals at Royal Welsh College of Music & Drama for 4 years and describes her sound as soul and jazz inspired. She is influenced by artists like Aretha Franklin, Stevie Nicks, Eva Cassidy, Joni Mitchell and Ella Fitzgerald. While studying in Cardiff, Grace was chosen to be part of the BBC Wales Horizons scheme that helps to support and guide new Welsh artists. During this time Grace played at various festivals, and recorded a live session at Maida Vale Studios in London.

Grace was signed to Never Fade Records (Gabrielle Aplin) after she joined Gabrielle Aplin on her 2013 English Rain album tour.

Her debut EP Meant to Be Kind was released in July 2014 on Never Fade Records. "Broke", taken from the EP, was chosen as an iTunes 'Single of the Week'. Grace co-wrote this EP with producer Luke Potashnick who she has continued to work with throughout her career.

Grace released her second EP Mustang in June 2016. (also a collaboration with Potashnick). After the release of 'Mustang' Hannah Grace caught the attention of Dermot O'Leary who invited the singer to perform on his Radio 2 programme where she performed "Mustang" and a cover of "Rather Go Blind" by Etta James. She has since done a live session on Michael Ball’s show on BBC Radio 2, and been invited back to Dermot's show with Gabrielle Aplin to promote their collaborative Christmas EP 'December'.

Grace has supported artists like Hozier, Jess Glynne, Gabrielle Aplin, Orla Gartland, Seal, Train, Lissie, Hudson Taylor and The Staves on shows and tours in the UK and Europe. Grace also gained a support slot for Barbra Streisand's Hyde Park summertime show in 2019.

Grace's singles, "Praise You", "With You", "Blue", and "How True Is Your Love" all made it to the BBC Radio 2 playlist. Hannah Grace has also performed on BBC Radio Wales programmes numerous times, and had many of her singles playlisted at her home radio station.

In March 2017 Lady Gaga tweeted a video of Grace calling her a "superstar". In April 2017 Grace released her cover of the Fatboy Slim song 'Praise You' which was chosen as the soundtrack for Lloyds Bank nationwide TV and radio campaign. Grace's version of the track has been used on numerous TV programmes including The X Factor and has sold in excess of 60,000 copies in the UK. It has more recently been used for the Lancôme 2020 global Christmas campaign featuring Julia Roberts & Amanda Seyfried

Grace released her third EP 'The Bed You Made' in March 2019. This was co-written and produced with Martin Luke Brown, and also includes songs written with Laura White, Jessica Sharman and Gabrielle Aplin.

Grace released six new singles in 2020 and in June, announced her debut studio album, Remedy, which was released on 20 November 2020. The album was produced by a number of different producers. The majority by production duo MyRiot (London Grammar, Rae Morris, Aurora). Long time collaborator Luke Potashnick (Gabrielle Aplin, Katie Melua), Ian Barter, (Paloma Faith, Amy Winehouse, Izzy Bizu) and Martin Luke Brown (Victoria Canal, Nick Wilson). The album currently has a combined 7 million streams.

In 2020 Grace was chosen as one of the new Virgin Money emerging stars, a programme that supports and helps to develop up and coming artists.

== Discography ==
=== Albums ===
List of studio albums
Title	Details
Remedy	Released: 20 November 2020; Label: Never Fade; Format: Digital download, streaming
Bigger Picture	Released: 22nd August 2025; Independently released

=== Extended plays ===
List of extended plays
Title	Details
Meant to Be Kind	Released: 28 July 2014; Label: Never Fade; Format: Digital download
Mustang	Released: 15 July 2016; Label: Never Fade; Format: Digital download
Praise You	Released: 15 July 2016; Label: Never Fade / BMG; Format: Digital download
December (with Gabrielle Aplin)	Released: 4 December 2018; Label: Never Fade; Format: Digital download
The Bed You Made	Released: 15 March 2019; Label: Never Fade; Format: Digital download
