= Phosphorescent (album) =

Studio album by Gabrielle Aplin
- Released: 6 January 2023
- Length: 37:32
- Label: Never Fade; AWAL
- Producer: Gabrielle Aplin; Mike Spencer; Liz Horsman

Gabrielle Aplin chronology
Dear Happy (2020)	Phosphorescent (2023)	Writer's Block, Pt. 1 (2024)

Singles from Phosphorescent
- 1. "Skylight" Released: 24 December 2021; 2. "Call Me" Released: 15 June 2022; 3. "Never Be The Same" Released: 10 October 2022

Phosphorescent is the fourth studio album by English singer-songwriter Gabrielle Aplin. It was released on 6 January 2023, through Aplin's own label Never Fade Records, and distribution group AWAL.

== Critical reception ==
Professional ratings
Review scores
Source	Rating
The Irish Times	3/5 stars
Clash	8/10

Lauren Murphy of The Irish Times rated the album 3 out of 5 stars calling it "an album of two halves: either inconsistent or enjoyably varied". She further added, "between the lovelorn lyrical cliches and throwaway songs ... there are some really promising songs and several glimpses of Aplin’s talent as a songwriter". Writing for Clash, Josh Abraham noted the album "allows listeners to sit back, relax, and run away from life for just a moment, and praised "‘Skylight’, ‘I Wish I Didn’t Press Send’, and ‘Take It Easy’ [as] immediate stand outs" with their "honest lyricism and beautifully put-together production."

== Track listing ==
No.	Title	Length
1.	"Skylight"	4:00
2.	"Never Be the Same"	3:25
3.	"Good Enough"	3:08
4.	"Anyway"	3:31
5.	"Wish I Didnt Press Send"	3:40
6.	"Take It Easy"	3:11
7.	"Don't Know What I Want"	2:25
8.	"Call Me"	3:28
9.	"Half in Half Out"	4:04
10.	"Mariana Trench"	3:16
11.	"Don't Say"	3:24
Total length:		37:32

== Charts ==
Chart performance for Phosphorescent
Chart (2023)	Peak position
Scottish Albums (OCC)	3
UK Albums (OCC)	15

== Release history ==
Release dates and formats for Phosphorescent
Region	Date	Format(s)	Label	Ref.
Various	6 January 2023	CD; digital download; LP; streaming	Never Fade; AWAL	
