= December (Gabrielle Aplin and Hannah Grace EP) =

2018 EP by Gabrielle Aplin and Hannah Grace

EP by Gabrielle Aplin and Hannah Grace
- Released: 4 December 2018
- Length: 11:38
- Label: Never Fade

Gabrielle Aplin chronology
Avalon (2017)	December (2018)	Dear Happy (2020)

Hannah Grace chronology
Praise You (2016)	December (2018)

December is a collaborative Christmas extended play (EP) by English singer Gabrielle Aplin and Welsh singer Hannah Grace. The EP was released through Never Fade Records on 4 December 2018. It is Aplin's seventh EP, following Avalon (2017), and Grace's fourth. The album includes an original song, "December", accompanied by three cover tracks. It was re-released on 15 November 2019, featuring 2 additional covers.

== Track listing ==
No.	Title	Writer(s)	Length
1.	"December"	Gabrielle Aplin; Hannah Grace; Luke Potashnick	4:20
2.	"River"	Joni Mitchell	3:01
3.	"Blue Christmas"	Billy Hayes; Jay Johnson	1:56
4.	"Have Yourself a Merry Little Christmas"	Hugh Martin; Ralph Blane	2:21
Total length:			11:38

2019 Re-release
No.	Title	Writer(s)	Length
1.	"December"	Gabrielle Aplin; Hannah Grace; Luke Potashnick	4:21
2.	"All I Want for Christmas is You"	Mariah Carey; Walter Afanasieff	4:39
3.	"In the Bleak Midwinter"	Christina Rossetti; Gustav Holst	3:25
4.	"River"	Joni Mitchell	3:01
5.	"Blue Christmas"	Billy Hayes; Jay Johnson	1:57
6.	"Have Yourself a Merry Little Christmas"	Hugh Martin; Ralph Blane	2:21
Total length:			19:43
