= Saint Raymond (musician) =

British singer-songwriter

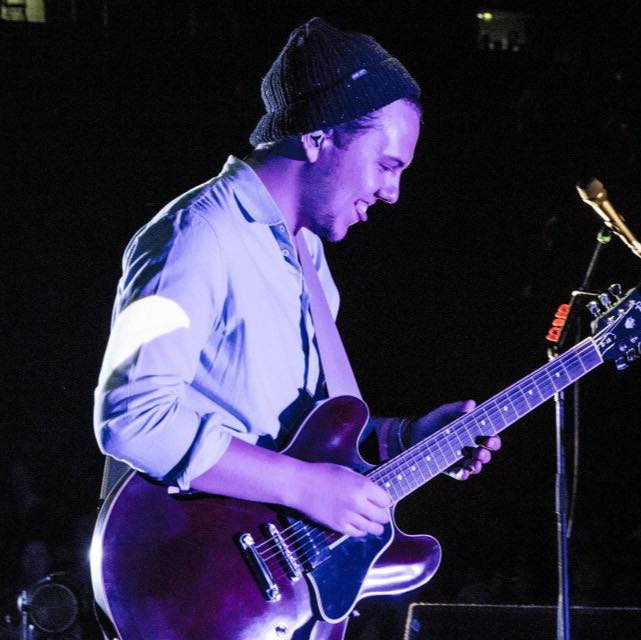
- Saint Raymond in 2014

Background information
- Born: Callum Burrows; 30 March 1995 (age 31); Nottingham, England
- Genres: Pop, indie rock
- Occupation: Singer-songwriter
- Years active: 2012–present
- Website: saintraymond.co.uk

Callum Burrows (born 30 March 1995), known professionally as Saint Raymond, is an English singer-songwriter from Nottingham. He has released two albums, four EPs and a number of singles.

== Early career ==
Burrows grew up in Bramcote, Nottingham. He took the 'Saint Raymond' name from the street that he grew up on and his grandfather's name.

He began his career playing small gigs and open mic nights around Nottingham before gaining popularity in 2013 when he released his self penned, debut extended play Escapade on Gabrielle Aplin's Never Fade Records. It featured heavily in the iTunes album chart upon its release and the lead track "Fall At Your Feet" was promoted as iTunes Single of the Week.

Burrows received early support from BBC Introducing and after a successful slot on the BBC Introducing Stage at Reading and Leeds Festival in August 2013, it was announced that Burrows had signed a major record deal with Asylum Records.

Burrows embarked on a headline tour in the UK and Ireland in September 2013 before announcing in October that he would be supporting Californian rock band Haim on their sold out UK and European tour in December.

In January 2014, Burrows released his second EP Young Blood on indie label National Anthem. The title track featured as Zane Lowe's "Hottest Record in The World".

Burrows was invited to perform a live session in Maida Vale Studios for BBC Radio 1 and Zane Lowe in January 2014.

== Ed Sheeran tour and Young Blood ==
In April 2014, Burrows was announced as the opening act for Ed Sheeran's three-month Autumn Multiply Tour in the UK and Europe.

Burrows released his third EP Ghosts on Asylum Records in May 2014. Lead track 'Everything She Wants' and its subsequent remix by art rock band Everything Everything were both made 'Hottest Records' on Zane Lowe's BBC Radio 1 show.

In September 2014, Burrows announced that he was working on his debut album Young Blood with the Irish music producer Jacknife Lee (U2, Bloc Party, Kasabian).

The album was released on 3 July 2015 on Asylum Records and it reached no. 8 in the UK album chart.

In November 2015, "Young Blood" was released as a DLC track for Rock Band 4, exclusively bundled with Ed Sheeran's "Sing" as a special edition.

Following the release of his new album, Burrows went on a solo headline tour in the UK in November and December 2015, during which he performed his new song called "We Are Fire".

His song "Wild Heart" was used as part of the FIFA 15 soundtrack.

== Discography ==
=== Albums ===
- Young Blood (July 2015) UK No. 8
- We Forgot We Were Dreaming (April 2021)

=== Extended plays ===
- Escapade (April 2013)
- Young Blood (January 2014)
- Ghosts (May 2014)
- A Light That Blinds (November 2017)
- 3 (March 2019)

=== Singles ===
- "Young Blood" (January 2014) UK No. 58
- "Everything She Wants" (May 2014)
- "I Want You" (August 2014) UK No. 76
- "Fall At Your Feet" (December 2014)
- "Come Back to You" (April 2015)
- "Be There" (May 2015)
- "Don't Fail Me Now" (June 2015)
- "Oh Brother" (January 2017)
- "Nightcrawling" (October 2017)
- "We Are Fire" (November 2017)
- "Dancing" (May 2018)
- "Carried Away" (June 2018)
- "One More Night" (August 2018)
- "Echo" (October 2018)
- "Right Way Round" (May 2020)
- "Love This Way" (August 2020)
- "Wide Eyed Blind" (September 2020)
- "Solid Gold" (November 2020)
- "Alright" (January 2021)
- "Soft Landing" (March 2021)
