= Sweet Nothing (Gabrielle Aplin song) =

Single by Gabrielle Aplin

from the album Light Up the Dark
- Released: 6 August 2015
- Recorded: 2014
- Genre: Pop
- Length: 2:53
- Label: Parlophone
- Songwriter(s): Gabrielle Aplin; Luke Potashnick; Charlotte O'Connor
- Producer(s): Luke Potashnick

Gabrielle Aplin singles chronology
"Light Up the Dark" (2015)	"Sweet Nothing" (2015)	"Miss You" (2016)

"Sweet Nothing" is a song performed by English singer-songwriter Gabrielle Aplin. The song was released as a digital download on 6 August 2015 as the second single from her second studio album Light Up the Dark. The song was written by Gabrielle Aplin, Luke Potashnick and Charlotte O'Connor.

== Music video ==
A music video to accompany the release of "Sweet Nothing" was first released onto YouTube on 6 August 2015.

== Track listing ==
Digital download
No.	Title	Length
1.	"Sweet Nothing"	2:53

== Charts ==
Chart (2015)	Peak position
Scotland (OCC)	63
UK Singles Downloads (OCC)	80
UK Singles (Official Charts Company)	178

== Release history ==
Region	Date	Format	Label
United Kingdom	6 August 2015	Digital download	Parlophone
