= Avalon (EP) =

2017 EP by Gabrielle Aplin

EP by Gabrielle Aplin
- Released: 6 October 2017
- Length: 14:48
- Label: Never Fade
- Producer: Lostboy; Nick Atkinson; Edd Holloway

Gabrielle Aplin chronology
Miss You (2016)	Avalon (2017)	December (2018)

Singles from Avalon
- 1. "Waking Up Slow" Released: 1 September 2017

Avalon is the sixth extended play (EP) by English singer-songwriter Gabrielle Aplin. It was released on 6 October 2017 through Aplin's record label, Never Fade Records. The title of the EP is a reference to the island of Avalon in the legends surrounding King Arthur. The EP was supported by the lead single, "Waking Up Slow", released on 1 September 2017.

== Track listing ==
No.	Title	Writer(s)	Producer(s)	Length
1.	"Waking Up Slow"	Gabrielle Aplin; Peter Rycroft	Lostboy	3:24
2.	"Say Nothing"	Aplin; Nick Atkinson; Edd Holloway	Atkinson; Holloway	3:40
3.	"Used to Do"	Aplin; Atkinson; Holloway	Atkinson; Holloway	3:40
4.	"Stay"	Aplin; Atkinson; Holloway	Atkinson; Holloway	4:04
Total length:				14:48
