= Panic Cord =

Single by Gabrielle Aplin

from the album English Rain and Never Fade
- Released: 5 May 2013
- Recorded: 2011
- Genre: Folk pop; country
- Length: 3:27
- Label: Parlophone
- Songwriter(s): Gabrielle Aplin; Jez Ashurst; Nick Atkinson; Aiman Faiz; Alice Patterson
- Producer(s): Mike Spencer

Gabrielle Aplin singles chronology
"Please Don't Say You Love Me" (2013)	"Panic Cord" (2013)	"Home" (2013)

"Panic Cord" is a song by English singer-songwriter Gabrielle Aplin. It was released as the third single from her debut studio album English Rain (2013). It was released as a digital Extended play in the United Kingdom on 5 May 2013. The song is originally taken from Aplin's second self-released EP, Never Fade.

It reached Number 19 in the UK Singles Chart on 12 May.

== Music video ==
A music video directed by Kinga Burza to accompany the release of "Panic Cord" was first released onto YouTube on 10 March 2013 at a total length of three minutes and twenty-seven seconds.

== Track listings ==
Digital download - EP
No.	Title	Length
1.	"Panic Cord"	3:27
2.	"Dreams" ((with Bastille))	4:20
3.	"Panic Cord" (Hucci Remix)	4:50
4.	"Please Don't Say You Love Me" (Cyril Hahn Remix Edit)	3:53

Vinyl
No.	Title	Length
1.	"Panic Cord"	3:27
2.	"Panic Cord" (Hucci Remix)	4:50

== Chart performance ==
Chart (2013)	Peak position
Belgium (Ultratip Bubbling Under Flanders)	10
Ireland (IRMA)	77
Japan (Japan Hot 100)	10
Japan Hot Overseas (Billboard)	1
Scotland (OCC)	19
UK Singles (OCC)	19

== Release history ==
Region	Date	Format	Label
United Kingdom	5 May 2013	Digital download	Parlophone
