= Nothing Really Matters (Gabrielle Aplin song) =

Single by Gabrielle Aplin

from the album Dear Happy
- Released: 27 March 2019
- Genre: Pop
- Length: 2:44
- Label: Never Fade; AWAL
- Songwriter(s): Gabrielle Aplin; Olivia Sebastianelli; Tommy Baxter
- Producer(s): Lostboy; Tommy Baxter

Gabrielle Aplin singles chronology
| "My Mistake" (2018) | "Nothing Really Matters" (2019) | "Losing Me" (2019) |

"Nothing Really Matters" is a song by English singer-songwriter Gabrielle Aplin, released on 27 March 2019 through Never Fade Records and AWAL. It serves as the second single from Aplin's upcoming third studio album, Dear Happy (2020). It was written by Aplin with Olivia Sebastianelli and Tommy Baxter, and produced by Baxter with Lostboy.

== Background ==
Aplin stated that the song is about "the battle between the excitement of wanting to open up, and the fear of opening up".

== Critical reception ==
The song was called an "upbeat pop number championing self love" with "jangly piano chords" and "glimmering synth keys" by Wonderland Magazine.
