= Home (Gabrielle Aplin song) =

Single by Gabrielle Aplin

from the album English Rain
- Released: 14 July 2013
- Recorded: 2012–13
- Genre: Folk pop
- Length: 4:09
- Label: Parlophone
- Songwriter(s): Gabrielle Aplin; Nick Atkinson
- Producer(s): Mike Spencer

Gabrielle Aplin singles chronology
| "Panic Cord" (2013) | "Home" (2013) | "Salvation" (2014) |

"Home" is a single by British singer-songwriter Gabrielle Aplin. It was released as the fourth single from her debut studio album English Rain (2013). The song was released in the United Kingdom as a digital download on 14 July 2013 through Parlophone. The song peaked at number 48 on the UK Singles Chart.

== Music video ==
A music video to accompany the release of "Home" was first released onto YouTube on 9 June 2013 at a total length of four minutes and twenty-five seconds. The song was featured on the trailer for the Academy Award-nominated drama film Brooklyn.

== Track listing ==
Digital download
| No. | Title | Length |
|---|---|---|
| 1. | "Home" | 4:09 |

== Charts ==
| Chart (2013) | Peak position |
|---|---|
| UK Singles (OCC) | 48 |

== Certifications ==
| Region | Certification | Certified units/sales |
|---|---|---|
| United Kingdom (BPI) | Silver | 200,000^{‡} |
^{‡} Sales+streaming figures based on certification alone.

== Release history ==
| Region | Date | Format | Label |
|---|---|---|---|
| United Kingdom | 14 July 2013 | Digital download | Parlophone |
