= Please Don't Say You Love Me =

2013 single by Gabrielle Aplin

Single by Gabrielle Aplin

from the album English Rain
- Released: 10 February 2013
- Recorded: 2012
- Genre: Folk pop
- Length: 3:01
- Label: EMI Records, Parlophone
- Songwriters: Gabrielle Aplin; Nicholas Atkinson
- Producer: Mike Spencer

Gabrielle Aplin singles chronology
| "The Power of Love" (2012) | "Please Don't Say You Love Me" (2013) | "Panic Cord" (2013) |

"Please Don't Say You Love Me" is a song by British singer-songwriter Gabrielle Aplin. It was released as the second single from her debut studio album, English Rain (2013). It was released as a digital download in the United Kingdom on 10 February 2013 and reached number six on the UK Singles Chart. In 2014 the song was released in Australia, where it debuted and peaked at number three on the ARIA Singles Chart, becoming Aplin's highest-charting single there. It is currently certified Gold in the United Kingdom and Platinum in Australia.

== Composition ==
"Please Don't Say You Love Me" was written and composed in 2012 by Aplin and Nicholas Atkinson. Sheet music shows that "Please Don't Say You Love Me" is set in the key of C Major. It is written in 2/2 time with a slow tempo of 86 beats per minute. Aplin's vocals span from A_{3} to C_{5}.

== Music video ==
A music video to accompany the release of "Please Don't Say You Love Me" was first released onto YouTube on 27 July 2012 at a total length of three minutes and twenty-eight seconds, starring Agents of S.H.I.E.L.D.'s Iain De Caestecker and the actress Ophelia Lovibond. It was filmed in and around The Five Horseshoes in Maidensgrove, Oxfordshire.

== Usage ==
An acoustic version of "Please Don't Say You Love Me" was featured in the closing episode of Channel 4 soap Hollyoaks on 19 April 2013 when it was used during the exit of popular character Jacqui McQueen.

Although it was released in 2013, "Please Don't Say You Love Me" debuted at number three on the ARIA Charts on 28 July 2014, after Rachael Thompson performed it in her audition for The X Factor Australia.

== Track listings ==
Digital download - EP
| No. | Title | Length |
|---|---|---|
| 1. | "Please Don't Say You Love Me" | 3:01 |
| 2. | "Stranger Side" | 3:04 |
| 3. | "Rings Round Roses" | 2:59 |
| 4. | "Please Don't Say You Love Me" (piano version) | 3:41 |

== Charts ==
=== Weekly charts ===
| Chart (2013–2014) | Peak position |
|---|---|
| Australia (ARIA) | 3 |
| Belgium (Ultratop 50 Flanders) | 48 |
| Ireland (IRMA) | 27 |
| Scotland Singles (OCC) | 5 |
| UK Singles (OCC) | 6 |

=== Year-end charts ===
| Chart (2013) | Position |
|---|---|
| UK Singles (OCC) | 136 |

| Chart (2014) | Position |
|---|---|
| Australia (ARIA) | 88 |

== Certifications ==
| Region | Certification | Certified units/sales |
|---|---|---|
| Australia (ARIA) | Platinum | 70,000^{^} |
| Denmark (IFPI Danmark) | Gold | 45,000^{‡} |
| United Kingdom (BPI) | Gold | 400,000^{‡} |
^{^} Shipments figures based on certification alone.^{‡} Sales+streaming figures based on certification alone.

== Release history ==
| Region | Date | Format | Label |
|---|---|---|---|
| United Kingdom | 10 February 2013 | Digital download | EMI Records, Parlophone |
