= Unklejam =

British dance music band

- Origin: UK
- Genres: Electronica, funk soul, R&B
- Years active: 2006–unknown
- Label: Virgin Records (2006-unknown)
- Members: Tendai Tyson; Bobby Joel Stearns; Adonistar

Unklejam were a British dance music band formed by Tendai Tyson.

== Background ==
Unklejam's name is taken from Funkadelic's 1979 album Uncle Jam Wants You. Their sound is a mixture of electro, R&B and soul with influences ranging from P-Funk to Prince and Sly and the Family Stone. The band were signed to Virgin Records.

Their debut single "Love Ya" was played on BBC Radio 1 by Trevor Nelson and Annie Mac and was also performed live on Popworld on Channel 4. The single was B-listed at BBC Radio 1 and charted at number 54 in the UK Singles Chart. It was also included in the soundtrack for the video game, NBA Live 2008. The video for the song has been directed by Paul Gore. The group then released their second single "What Am I Fighting For?" following a stint supporting Nelly Furtado on her world tour, and Justin Timberlake on the European leg of his FutureSex/LoveSounds tour. The single was a much bigger success, peaking in the UK Singles Chart top twenty and peaking at number eight on the UK iTunes Store.

The group's debut self-titled album was initially due for release on 11 June 2007, one week after the release of the group's second single "What Am I Fighting For?". However, the release date for the album was pushed back to 10 September 2007, with a third single planned to precede the album release.

In Summer 2007 they embarked a small UK tour including a date at the newly refurbished Opera House in Bournemouth. "Arthur Baker's Return to New York and Maison present..." on Friday 6 July 2007 was the first in a series of monthly events. The tour also included the Wireless Festival, Glastonbury and T in the Park.

Their third single "Stereo" (released 22 October) failed to appear in the UK Singles Chart.

== Discography ==
=== Album ===
- Unklejam - available as digital download 29 October 2007
- Unklejam - available as physical release 4 February 2008

=== Singles ===
| Year | Single | Chart positions | | | | | | Album |
| Year | Single | UK | U.S. | U.S. R&B | AUS | CAN | JAP | Album |
|---|---|---|---|---|---|---|---|---|
| 2007 | "Love Ya" | 54 | - | - | 7 | 4 | 1 | Unklejam |
| 2007 | "What Am I Fighting For?" | 16 | 5 | - | 4 | 2 | 1 | Unklejam |
| 2007 | "Stereo" | - | - | - | 8 | 9 | 9 | Unklejam |
