= Dear Happy =

Studio album by Gabrielle Aplin
- Released: 17 January 2020
- Label: Never Fade; AWAL
- Producer: Gabrielle Aplin; Tommy Baxter; Seton Daunt; Simen Hope; Liz Horsman; Ash Howes; Lostboy; Askjell Solstrand; Mike Spencer

Gabrielle Aplin chronology
| December (2018) | Dear Happy (2020) |

Gabrielle Aplin studio album chronology
| Light Up the Dark (2015) | Dear Happy (2020) | Phosphorescent (2023) |

Singles from Dear Happy
- 1. "My Mistake" Released: 28 November 2018; 2. "Nothing Really Matters" Released: 27 March 2019; 3. "Losing Me" Released: 14 August 2019; 4. "Kintsugi" Released: 11 September 2019

Dear Happy is the third studio album by English singer-songwriter Gabrielle Aplin. It was released on 17 January 2020, through Aplin's own label Never Fade Records, and distribution group AWAL. Dear Happy marks Aplin's first studio-length release since her second studio album Light Up the Dark (2015). The album was announced through Aplin's Twitter and website on 10 September 2019. Aplin will tour in support of the record in early 2020.

== Background ==
Aplin said the album began "with the moment I made a definitive decision to start to unravel and rewire my brain", calling it "a past, present and future letter to myself". A press release described Dear Happy as an "uplifting pop record that chronicles Gabrielle's life, and the experiences and cultures she has been inspired by whilst touring and travelling the world over the past couple of years".

== Critical reception ==
Professional ratings
Review scores
| Source | Rating |
|---|---|
| The Sydney Morning Herald | 5/5 stars |
| Gigwise | 8/10 stars |
| The Independent | 3/5 stars |

Jessie Cunniffe of The Sydney Morning Herald awarded the album five stars out five and deemed it "an intricate portrait of the bruises and realisations of the aftermath of [any quarter-life crisis] phase". Gigwise's Tommy Monroe praised the album's "deep lyrics, emotive vocals and catchy hooks". In a mixed review, The Independent's Annabel Nugent highlighted how the album was "expertly engineered for pop virality" but criticized its "saccharine" moments.

== Track listing ==
Dear Happy track listing
| No. | Title | Writer(s) | Producer(s) | Length |
|---|---|---|---|---|
| 1. | "Until the Sun Comes Up" | Gabrielle Aplin; Peter Rycroft | Lostboy | 3:10 |
| 2. | "Invisible" | Aplin; Nicholas Atkinson; Edd Holloway | Atkinson; Holloway | 3:55 |
| 3. | "One of Those Days" | Aplin; Atkinson; Holloway | Atkinson; Holloway | 4:03 |
| 4. | "Kintsugi" | Aplin; Simen Hope; Askjell Solstrand | Hope; Solstrand | 2:56 |
| 5. | "Strange" | Aplin; Rycroft | Lostboy | 2:43 |
| 6. | "My Mistake" | Aplin; Ash Howes; Seton Daunt; Olivia Sebastianelli | Howes; Daunt | 4:25 |
| 7. | "Like You Say You Do" | Aplin; Lauren Aquilina; Rycroft | Lostboy | 3:07 |
| 8. | "Losing Me" (with JP Cooper) | Aplin; Matthew Prime; Mike Spencer; Nathaniel Cyphert | Lostboy; Spencer | 3:01 |
| 9. | "So Far So Good" | Aplin; Liz Horsman; Rycroft | Lostboy | 3:18 |
| 10. | "Nothing Really Matters" | Aplin; Thomas Baxter; Sebastianelli | Lostboy; Baxter | 2:44 |
| 11. | "Magic" | Aplin; Atkinson; Holloway | Atkinson; Holloway | 4:05 |
| 12. | "Love Back" | Aplin; Paul Dixon; Maxwell Cooke | Dixon | 2:46 |
| 13. | "Miss You" | Aplin; Horsman | Horsman; Spencer | 3:17 |
| 14. | "Dear Happy" | Aplin; Horsman; Jamie Hartman | Atkinson; Holloway; Hartman; Spencer | 3:21 |

Dear Happy – Japan edition
| No. | Title | Length |
|---|---|---|
| 15. | "Miss You 2" (with Nina Nesbitt) | 3:16 |
| 16. | "My Mistake" (Piano Version) | 4:54 |
| 17. | "Nothing Really Matters" (Piano Version) | 3:14 |
| 18. | "Losing Me" (with JP Cooper) (Piano Version) | 3:11 |
| Total length: | | 1:01:44 |

== Charts ==
Dear Happy sales chart performance
| Chart (2020) | Peak position |
|---|---|
| Australian Digital Albums (ARIA) | 18 |
| Scottish Albums (OCC) | 15 |
| UK Albums (OCC) | 24 |
