= Hudson Taylor (group) =

Irish folk/Americana duo

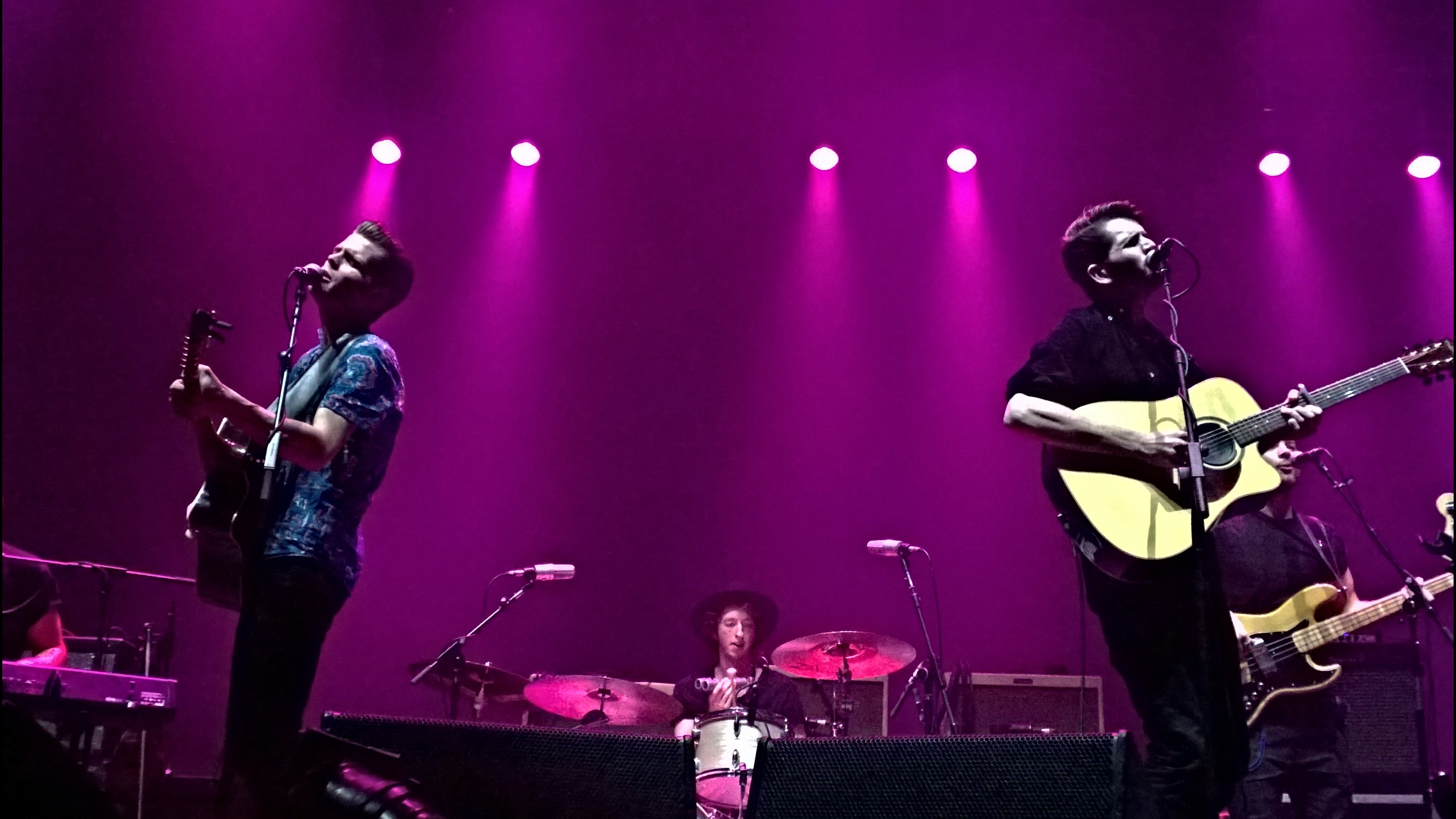
- Hudson Taylor at Alexandra Palace in London in 2014

Background information
- Origin: Dublin, Ireland
- Genres: Folk, Americana
- Years active: 2011–2022
- Labels: Rubyworks
- Past members: Harry Hudson-Taylor; Alfie Hudson-Taylor
- Website: hudsontaylorband.com

Hudson Taylor was an Irish folk and Americana duo formed in 2011, who split up in 2022. The lineup consisted of brothers Harry and Alfie Hudson-Taylor, who were signed to Rubyworks Records.

== History ==
=== Early career ===
The multi-instrumental siblings began busking on the streets of their hometown of Dublin as well as cities all over Europe. Their self-released debut EP Battles came out in August 2012 and peaked at #1 on the Irish iTunes chart and at #14 in the UK. Following the success of Battles, the duo unveiled a second EP, Cinematic Lifestyle released in December 2012 and its subsequent release Osea, in October 2013. The duo supported Jake Bugg on his UK tours in March 2013 and again in the Autumn of 2014. They also played to one of their biggest crowds to date supporting The Rolling Stones in Hyde Park in 2013.

=== Singing for Strangers ===
Hudson Taylor's debut album Singing for Strangers (a reference to the duo's earlier busking days) was released on major label Polydor in January 2015 to critical acclaim in Ireland and the UK. Singing for Strangers peaked at number 3 in Ireland and number 24 in the UK. Their first full-length offering was produced by Iain Archer, Grammy nominated singer-songwriter and producer who has songwriting credits for Jake Bugg, James Bay and Niall Horan. Singing for Strangers included hugely successful singles 'Chasing Rubies' and 'Battles'. Speaking of their influences when writing the 18 track album, the duo referenced Crosby, Stills & Nash and Simon & Garfunkel.

Following the group's departure from Polydor in February 2016, Hudson Taylor were signed to indie label Rubyworks Records in Ireland.

=== 2018–2022 ===
At the beginning of 2018, Hudson Taylor embarked on a European tour playing in the UK, Germany, Denmark, Sweden and Netherlands. At the end of January, they announced they would be opening for Gabrielle Aplin throughout her North American Tour. During their trip they made their US TV debut on Good Day New York on Fox and WGN-TV in Chicago. They also completed high-profile online sessions for Paste Magazine, Baeble Music and BalconyTV in LA.

In March 2018 the duo released the Feel It Again EP and amassed over 1.2 million monthly listeners on Spotify. It was produced by Ryan Hadlock, best known for his work with The Lumineers and Vance Joy, and mixed by Ruadhri Cushnan (Mumford & Sons, Ed Sheeran) in Dublin. Their lead-off single 'Feel It Again' was one of the biggest Irish airplay hits of 2017. With streaming figures well in excess of 10 million listens for the Feel It Again EP and tracks 'Run With Me' and 'Old Soul' finding favour at radio and digital platforms, Hudson Taylor wrapped the Irish tour with a sold out, home town show at Olympia Theatre, Dublin, which was recorded for future release.

Debuted on 21 September 2018, Hudson Taylor revealed their latest offering, a mini-album entitled Bear Creek to Dame Street. Four individual singles were released in the buildup to the mini-album including 'You Don't Wanna Know' and 'One in a Million' at the end of August, followed by 'I Love You and You Don't Even Know' and 'Shot Someone'. The band described their mini-album as a collection of new songs recorded at Bear Creek Studio by Ryan Hadlock along with "some old favourites recorded from our Dublin Olympia Theatre show."

Following the release, Hudson Taylor supported Hozier during his North American tour, opening 19 shows including 3 nights at both Beacon Theatre in New York City and Wiltern Theatre in Los Angeles. In between shows with Hozier, Hudson Taylor also played their own headline shows in New York, Washington DC and Boston at the end of September.

In November 2018, Hudson Taylor began their second European tour of the year including a headline show in KOKO in London, finishing with a 6 night home-coming run in Whelan's in Dublin in December.

In January and February 2019, they played a U.S. headline tour accompanied by Oisin and Tadgh Walsh-Peelo in their band.

In May and June 2019, the Hudson Taylor supported Rodrigo y Gabriela on their North American tour and played a number of shows while in the states.

After a period of quiet, the two brothers released the single "Won't Be Too Long" on 14 January 2022.

In October 2023, Harry announced on Instagram that the duo had split the previous year.

=== Post-breakup ===
Following the breakup of the band, Harry went on to release music as a solo musician under the alias of Lady Bird Lad, as well as hosting English learning projects in Germany. Alfie started a podcast called How to Break an Artist, delving into his experience in the music industry.

== Discography ==
=== Studio albums ===
Title	Album details	Peak chart positions	
Title	Album details	IRE	UK
Singing for Strangers	Released: 16 January 2015; Label: Polydor; Formats: CD, download, vinyl	3	24
Bear Creek to Dame Street	Released: 21 September 2018; Label: Rubyworks; Formats: Digital download, CD	78	—
Loving Everywhere I Go	Released: 28 February 2020; Label: Rubyworks; Formats: Digital download, CD	1	—
Searching for the Answers	Released: 3 June 2022; Label: Rubyworks; Formats: Digital download, CD	79	—

=== Extended plays ===
Title	Release details	Peak
Title	Release details	IRE
Battles	Released: 24 August 2012; Label: Polydor; Format: Digital download, CD	—
Cinematic Lifestyle	Released: November 2012; Label: Polydor; Format: Digital download, CD	55
Osea	Released: 11 October 2013; Label: Polydor; Format: Digital download, CD	36
Feel It Again	Released: 23 March 2018; Label: Rubyworks; Formats: Digital download, CD	4
"—" denotes an EP that did not chart or was not released.

=== Singles ===
Year	Title	Peak chart positions		Certifications	Album
Year	Title	IRE	UK	Certifications	Album
2014	"Battles (2014)"	35	—		Singing for Strangers
2014	"Chasing Rubies"	50	51		Singing for Strangers
2014	"Weapons"	53	—		Singing for Strangers
2015	"World Without You"	—	—		Singing for Strangers
2017	"Run with Me"	—	—		Feel It Again
2022	"Won't Be Too Long"	—	—		Searching for the Answers
2022	"You Me Myself"	—	—		Searching for the Answers
"—" denotes single that did not chart or was not released.

== Videography ==
- "Old Soul"
- "Run with Me"
- "Feel It Again"
- "Chasing Rubies"
- "World Without You"
- "Weapons"
- "Care"
- "Battles"
- "Back to You"
