= Charlotte OC =

British singer-songwriter

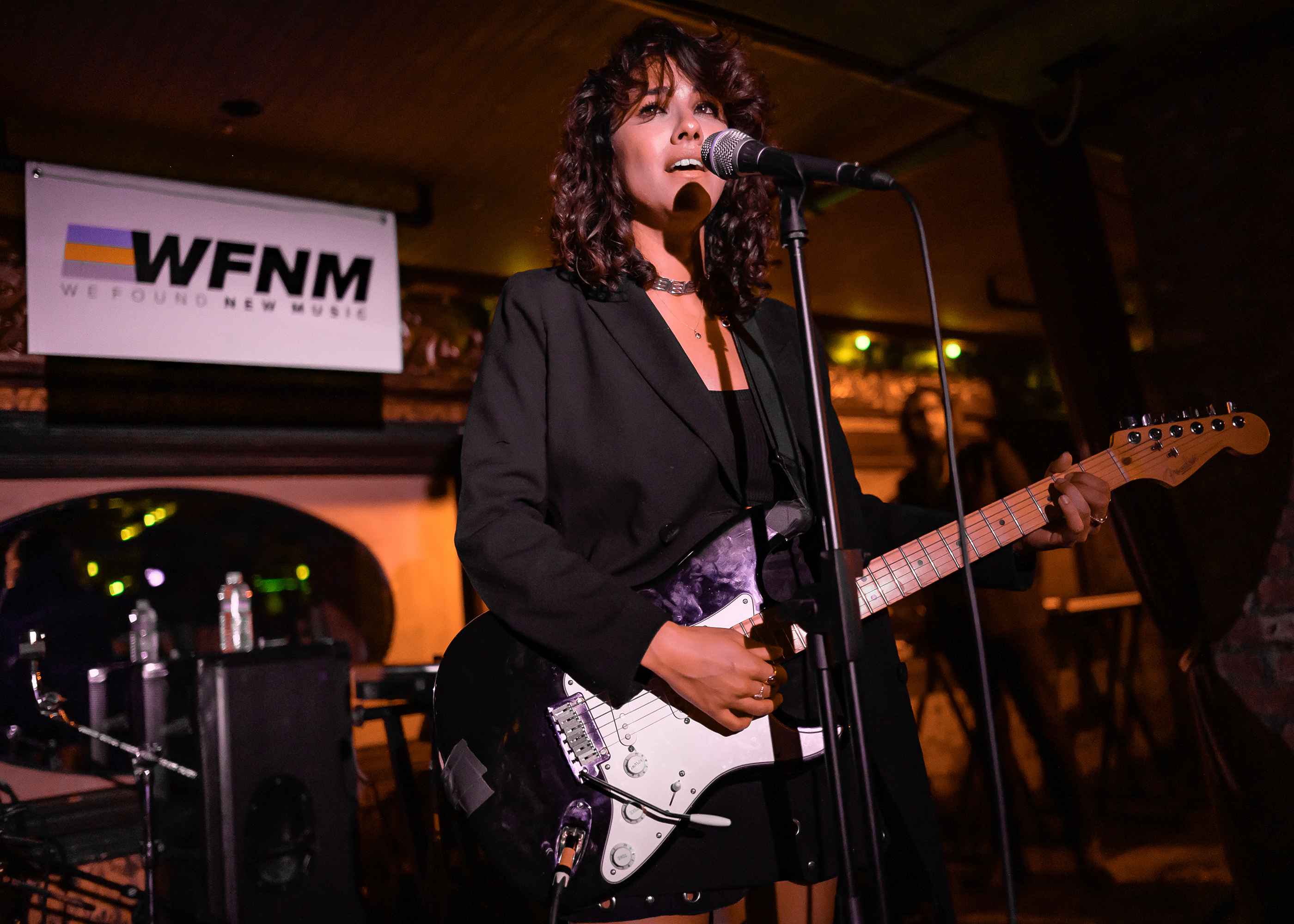
- O'Connor performing in 2019

Background information
- Born: Charlotte Mary O'Connor
- Origin: Blackburn, Lancashire, England
- Genres: Electronic; pop; soul
- Occupations: Singer; songwriter
- Instrument: Guitar
- Years active: 2008–present
- Labels: Columbia; Harvest; Polydor; Stranger

Charlotte Mary O'Connor, better known by her stage name Charlotte OC, is a British singer-songwriter.

== Biography ==
Charlotte O'Connor is the daughter of a half-Malawian, half-Indian mother and Irish father. She grew up in Blackburn, Lancashire, and attended Westholme School. She began playing the guitar at 15 years of age and attended weekend classes at the Liverpool Institute for Performing Arts. When she was 16 years old, she became a global ambassador for surfwear brand Quiksilver.

O'Connor's music attracted the attention of agent Sam Bush, who signed her to a contract and arranged gigs for her in the United States. She signed a four-album recording deal with Columbia Records in late 2008, when she was 18 years old. Her debut single, "Treasure Island", was released in September 2011 and her debut album, For Kenny (produced by Mario Caldato Jr.), followed in November. O'Connor was dropped by Columbia and subsequently took work in her mother's hairdressing salon.

O'Connor signed with Stranger Records in 2013. She released her first EP, Colour My Heart, in November 2013 under the stage name Charlotte OC; the same month, the BBC classed her as "tipped for success in 2014" and Digital Spy named her "one to watch". Her second EP, Strange, was released by Polydor Records in September 2014, and its track "Hangover" was playlisted on BBC Radio 1. Colour My Heart and Strange were recorded with producer Tim Anderson in Los Angeles. In March 2015, O'Connor released her third EP, Burning, which features the single "If My House Was Burning".

Her first album, the Anderson-produced Careless People, was released on 31 March 2017. It spawned four singles, "Darkest Hour", "Blackout", "Shell", and "Medicine Man".

On 15 May 2020, O'Connor released the EP Oh the Agony, Oh the Ecstasy featuring the three previously published songs "This Pain", "Freedom" and "Falling for You" as well as two new songs.

Since April 2021, the singer-songwriter released several new singles and EP's from her second studio album, Here Comes Trouble, which O'Connor released on 15 October 2021.

== Artistry ==
O'Connor described her music as being influenced by gospel, soul, and house musics, as well as by the electronic music she heard at the German nightclub Berghain. As her parents surrounded her with folk and soul music, she lists Alicia Keys, Leonard Cohen, Lou Reed, Joni Mitchell, Aretha Franklin, Billie Holiday and Marvin Gaye among her major influences. Noisey wrote that O'Connor "blends Bat for Lashes' cosmic mystic pop, Stevie Nicks' breathless vulnerability, and possesses the vocal chops to keep up with Adele", while Hunger magazine wrote that her output "feels spiritual and almost occultist".

== Discography ==
=== Albums ===
- For Kenny (2011)
- Careless People (2017)
- Here Comes Trouble (2021)

=== Extended plays ===
- Colour My Heart (2013)
- Strange (2014)
- Burning (2015)
- Oh the Agony, Oh the Ectasy (2020)
- ’’Seriously Love, Go Home’’ (2025)

=== Singles ===
- "Treasure Island" (September 2011)
- "Colour My Heart" (October 2013)
- "Hangover" (November 2013)
- "Strange" (August 2014)
- "If My House Was Burning" (March 2015)
- "On & On" (June 2015)
- "Blackout" (August 2016)
- "Darkest Hour" (September 2016)
- "Shell" (June 2017)
- "Medicine Man" (July 2017)
- "Satellite" (November 2018)
- "Boyfriend" (March 2019)
- "Better Off On My Own" (May 2019)
- "This Pain" (January 2020)
- "Freedom" (February 2020)
- "Falling for You" (April 2020)
- "Inevitable" (May 2021)
- "Centre of the Universe" (August 2021)
- "Mexico" (September 2021)
