= English Rain =

2013 debut studio album by Gabrielle Aplin

Studio album by Gabrielle Aplin
- Released: 13 May 2013
- Recorded: 2012–13
- Genre: Folk pop
- Length: 49:45
- Label: Parlophone
- Producer: Mike Spencer

Gabrielle Aplin chronology
Gabrielle Aplin: Live at Koko (2013)	English Rain (2013)	Gabrielle Aplin: iTunes Festival (2013)

Gabrielle Aplin studio album chronology
English Rain (2013)	Light Up the Dark (2015)

Singles from English Rain
- 1. "The Power of Love" Released: 9 November 2012; 2. "Please Don't Say You Love Me" Released: 10 February 2013; 3. "Panic Cord" Released: 5 May 2013; 4. "Home" Released: 14 July 2013; 5. "Salvation" Released: 12 January 2014

English Rain

EP by Gabrielle Aplin
- Released: 6 May 2014 (United States)
- Label: Never Fade; Warner Bros.

Gabrielle Aplin chronology
Gabrielle Aplin: iTunes Festival (2013)	English Rain (2014)	Light Up the Dark (2015)

Professional ratings
Review scores
Source	Rating
Allmusic	3.5/5 stars
Digital Spy	3/5 stars
The Guardian	3/5 stars
Red Online	(very positive)
Counter Act	3/5 stars
FemaleFirst	5/5 stars

English Rain is the debut studio album by English singer-songwriter Gabrielle Aplin. It was released on 13 May 2013 and serves as the follow-up to her 2012 extended play, Home. It serves as her first release with a major record label, and was released with Parlophone. The album debuted at number two in the UK Albums Chart, selling over 35,000 copies. It has since been certified gold in the UK for selling 100,000 copies.

== Background ==
On 29 February 2012, Aplin announced that she had signed to Parlophone and began recording her debut album in March 2012. Aplin was confirmed as the soundtrack to the John Lewis 2012 Christmas television advertisement, covering Frankie Goes to Hollywood's "The Power of Love".

On 12 December 2012, Aplin announced that the title of her debut album would be English Rain. In addition, she also unveiled its artwork and release date of 29 April 2013; however, the release date was pushed back by two weeks to 13 May. On 12 March 2013 Aplin released previews of the songs that would appear on the standard edition of English Rain. Aplin also worked with record producer Mike Spencer.

== Reception ==
=== Critical ===
The album was generally well received by critics, praising her for her vocals but calling the album safe and not particularly adventurous. Critics praised tracks such as "Salvation" for taking Aplin out of her "comfort zone" and compared "Please Don't Say You Love Me", the album's second single, to Mumford and Sons.

=== Commercial ===
English Rain was well received commercially. English Rain debuted at number two in the United Kingdom selling over 35,000 copies, the following week the album fell seven places to number nine. Internationally, the album achieved moderate success, charting at number 11 in Ireland on 19 May; 22 in Australia in 2014; 55 in Belgium and 39 in New Zealand.

On 23 July 2013, Aplin revealed on her Facebook page that English Rain had been certified gold (for selling 100,000 copies).

== Promotion ==
=== Tours ===
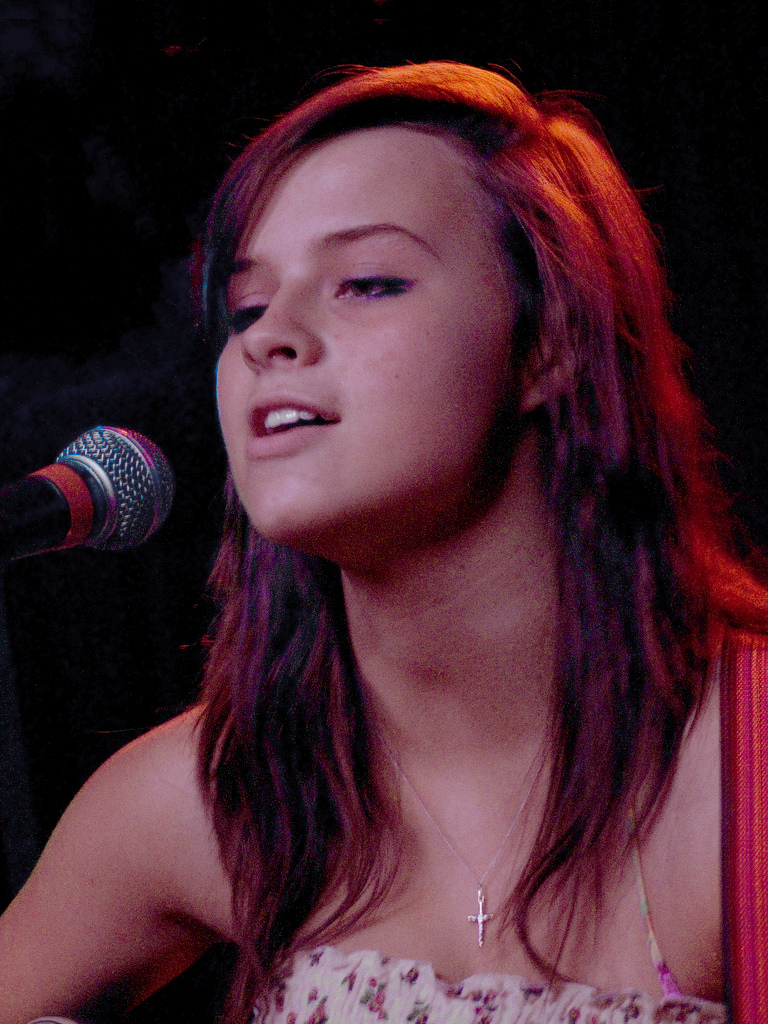
Aplin performing in Islington, London on 25 June 2010.

To promote the album, Aplin went on two tours. The first was a smaller, mini-tour which took place in March 2013, two months before the album's release, to smaller venues; while the second was a larger tour, where Aplin performed at larger venues such as the O2 Shepherd's Bush Empire in London. The second tour took place in Autumn 2013.

== Singles ==
Aplin's cover version of Frankie Goes to Hollywood's 1984 hit "The Power of Love" was released as the album's first and lead single on 9 November 2012 after being sampled in John Lewis' Christmas television advertisement. The song was well received critically and commercially, and entered the UK Singles Chart at number 36. It peaked at number one on 9 December 2012. Aplin's version was certified gold in the United Kingdom on 11 January 2013.

"Please Don't Say You Love Me" was released as the album's second single on 10 February and serves as the singer's first original single signed to Parlophone. On the week ending 16 February, the song debuted at number six on the UK Singles Chart, serving as her highest debut on the chart.

Aplin announced live on 17 February Radio 1 Chart Show that her third single would be "Panic Cord", a song taken from the singer's second EP, Never Fade. It was released on 5 May, a week prior to the album's release, and peaked at number 19 on the UK Singles Chart.

"Home" serves as the fourth single from the album. Shooting for the music video began on 20 May 2013 and the video was unveiled on 9 June. The single was released on 14 July and peaked at number 48 in the UK. "Home" was also featured on the ninth episode of Wentworth.

"Salvation" serves as the fifth single from the album, released on 12 January 2014. A music video for the song premiered on 3 December 2013.

== Track listing ==
No.	Title	Writer(s)	Producer(s)	Length
1.	"Panic Cord"	Gabrielle Aplin; Nicholas Atkinson; Jez Ashurst; Aiman Faiz	Mike Spencer	3:25
2.	"Keep on Walking"	Aplin; Atkinson	Spencer	2:52
3.	"Please Don't Say You Love Me"	Aplin; Atkinson	Spencer	3:00
4.	"How Do You Feel Today?"	Aplin; Atkinson; Thomas Wilding	Spencer; Tom Wilding	3:46
5.	"Home"	Aplin; Atkinson	Spencer	4:07
6.	"Salvation"	Aplin; Joel Pott	Spencer	4:10
7.	"Ready to Question"	Aplin; Atkinson; Wilding	Spencer	3:18
8.	"The Power of Love"	Peter Gill; Holly Johnson; Mark O'Toole	Spencer; David Kosten	4:06
9.	"Alive"	Aplin; Spencer	Spencer	4:11
10.	"Human"	Aplin; Atkinson; Wilding	Spencer	3:26
11.	"November"	Aplin; Atkinson	Spencer; Luke Potashnik	4:06
12.	"Start of Time"	Aplin; Jim Irvin; Julian Emery	Spencer; Emery	4:01

iTunes bonus track
No.	Title	Writer(s)	Producer(s)	Length
13.	"Take Me Away"	Aplin	Spencer	2:53

Deluxe edition bonus tracks
No.	Title	Writer(s)	Producer(s)	Length
13.	"Take Me Away"	Aplin	Spencer	2:53
14.	"Evaporate"	Aplin; Adam Argyle		3:32
15.	"Wake Up with Me"	Aplin; Iain Archer		3:26
16.	"Alive" (RAK Session)	Aplin; Spencer		4:08
17.	"Please Don't Say You Love Me" (RAK Session)	Aplin; Atkinson		3:00
18.	"Home" (RAK Session)	Aplin; Atkinson		4:09
19.	"How Do You Feel Today" (RAK Session)	Aplin; Atkinson; Wilding		3:57

Japanese deluxe edition bonus tracks
No.	Title	Writer(s)	Length
12.	"Through the Ages"		5:01
13.	"Start of Time"	Aplin; Irvin; Emery	3:59
14.	"Take Me Away"	Aplin	2:52
15.	"Stranger Side" (Live at KOKO)		2:54
16.	"How Do You Feel Today?" (Live at KOKO)	Aplin; Atkinson; Wilding	3:47
17.	"Go Your Own Way" (Live at KOKO)		3:39
18.	"Please Don't Say You Love Me" (Live at KOKO)	Aplin; Atkinson	3:19

== Charts ==
=== Weekly charts ===
Chart (2013–14)	Peak position
Australian Albums (ARIA)	10
Belgian Albums (Ultratop Flanders)	55
Belgian Albums (Ultratop Wallonia)	107
Irish Albums (IRMA)	11
New Zealand Albums (RMNZ)	39
Scottish Albums (OCC)	2
Spanish Albums (Promusicae)	33
Swiss Albums (Schweizer Hitparade)	95
UK Albums (OCC)	2

=== Year-end charts ===
Chart (2013)	Position
UK Albums (OCC)	66
Chart (2014)	Position
Australian Albums (ARIA)	61

== Certifications ==
Region	Certification	Certified units/sales
Australia (ARIA)	Gold	35,000^{^}
United Kingdom (BPI)	Gold	100,000^{*}
^{*} Sales figures based on certification alone.^{^} Shipments figures based on certification alone.

== Release history ==
Region	Date	Format	Label
Australia	17 May 2013	Digital download, CD, vinyl	Parlophone
United Kingdom	13 May 2013	Digital download, CD, vinyl	Parlophone
