= Mike Spencer =

English record producer

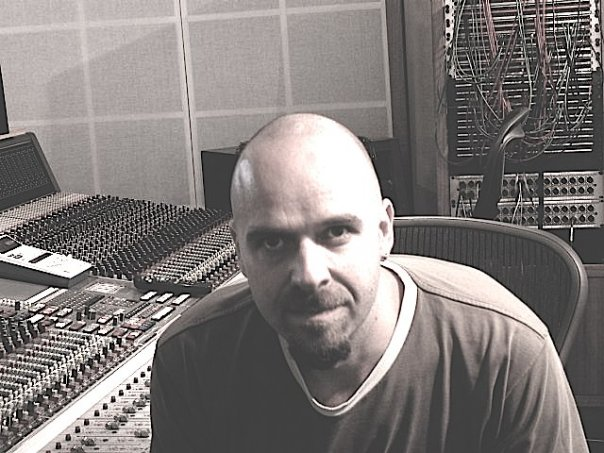
- Spencer in 2007

Background information
- Born: Michael Spencer
- Genres: Pop; rock; electronic
- Occupations: Record producer; record executive; receding engineer
- Instrument: Guitar
- Years active: 1998–present
- Website: mikespencer.com

Michael Spencer is an English record producer and recording engineer. He has worked with various pop acts, including Newton Faulkner, Jamiroquai, John Newman, Ellie Goulding, Alex Clare, and Emeli Sandé, among others. Many of his productions have received platinum certifications or higher by the British Phonographic Industry (BPI) or Recording Industry Association of America (RIAA), in addition to having won MOBO and Brit Awards, as well as Mercury Prize nominations.

== Selected discography ==
=== Singles ===
- 2022: "Ghosting" - Cat Burns
- 2022: "Emotionally Unavailable" - Cat Burns
- 2022: "My Brother" - Sam Tompkins
- 2021: "Skylight" - Gabrielle Aplin
- 2021: "We Cry" - JP Cooper
- 2019: "Losing Me" - Gabrielle Aplin, JP Cooper
- 2019: "Walk Away" - Four of Diamonds
- 2018: "Walk Alone" - Rudimental featuring Tom Walker (Vocal production)
- 2018: "Angels" - Tom Walker
- 2017: "My Lover" - Mabel with Not3s
- 2016: "September Song" - JP Cooper
- 2016: "Ain't My Fault" - Zara Larsson
- 2016: "Cruel" - Snakehips featuring Zayn Malik (Mix)
- 2016: "Surprise Yourself' - Jack Garratt
- 2015: "Miss You" - Gabrielle Aplin
- 2015: "Weathered" - Jack Garratt
- 2015: "Eyes Shut" - Years & Years
- 2015: "Lay It All on Me" - Rudimental featuring Ed Sheeran
- 2014: "Let It Be" - Labrinth
- 2014: "Glorious" - Foxes
- 2014: "Holding Onto Heaven" - Foxes
- 2013: "Free" - Rudimental featuring Emeli Sandé
- 2013: "Let Go for Tonight" - Foxes
- 2013: "Love Me Again" - John Newman
- 2013: "Please Don't Say You Love Me" - Gabrielle Aplin
- 2012: "Figure 8" - Ellie Goulding
- 2012: "The Power of Love"- Gabrielle Aplin
- 2012: "Not Giving In" - Rudimental
- 2012: "Clouds" - Newton Faulkner
- 2012: "Feel the Love" - Rudimental
- 2012: "Express Yourself" - Labrinth
- 2011: "Heaven" - Emeli Sandé
- 2011: "Down With the Trumpets" - Rizzle Kicks
- 2011: "Me Without You" - Loick Essien
- 2011: "Too Close" - Alex Clare
- 2010: "Once" - Diana Vickers
- 2009: "If This Is It (song)"– Newton Faulkner
- 2008: "Boyfriend" - Alphabeat
- 2007: "Runaway"' – Jamiroquai
- 2007: "Teardrop" – Newton Faulkner
- 2007: "Dream Catch Me" – Newton Faulkner
- 2007: "What Am I Fighting For?" – Unklejam
- 2005: "Feels Just Like It Should" – Jamiroquai
- 2005: "Seven Days in Sunny June" – Jamiroquai
- 2005: "(Don't) Give Hate a Chance" – Jamiroquai
- 2002: "Shoulda Woulda Coulda" - Beverley Knight
- 2000: "Spinning Around" – Kylie Minogue
- 1999: "Greatest Day" - Beverley Knight

=== Albums (contributed to) ===
- 2024: Early_Twenties - Cat Burns
- 2023: Phosphorescent_(album) - Gabrielle Aplin
- 2020: Dear Happy - Gabrielle Aplin
- 2019: What a Time to Be Alive - Tom Walker
- 2017: Raised Under Grey Skies - JP Cooper
- 2017: Automaton - Jamiroquai
- 2017: So Good - Zara Larsson
- 2016: You're a Man Now, Boy - Raleigh Ritchie
- 2016: Phase - Jack Garratt
- 2015: Communion - Years & Years
- 2015: We the Generation - Rudimental
- 2014: Glorious - Foxes
- 2013: Tribute - John Newman
- 2013: English Rain - Gabrielle Aplin
- 2013: Home - Rudimental
- 2012: Halcyon (Ellie Goulding album) - Ellie Goulding
- 2012: Electronic Earth - Labrinth
- 2012: Our Version of Events - Emeli Sandé (Heaven)
- 2011: Stereo Typical - Rizzle Kicks
- 2011: The Lateness of the Hour - Alex Clare
- 2010: Songs From The Tainted Cherry Tree - Diana Vickers (Once)
- 2009: Rebuilt by Humans – Newton Faulkner
- 2008: Let It Go - Will Young
- 2008: This Is Alphabeat - Alphabeat
- 2007: Hand Built By Robots – Newton Faulkner
- 2007: Unklejam – Unklejam
- 2007: High Times: Singles 1992-2006 – Jamiroquai
- 2007: Oi Va Voi – Oi Va Voi
- 2005: Dynamite – Jamiroquai
- 2002: Who I Am – Beverley Knight
- 2001: Signs – Badmarsh and Shri
- 2000: Light Years – Kylie Minogue (Spinning Around)
