= Gabrielle Aplin =

British singer (born 1992)

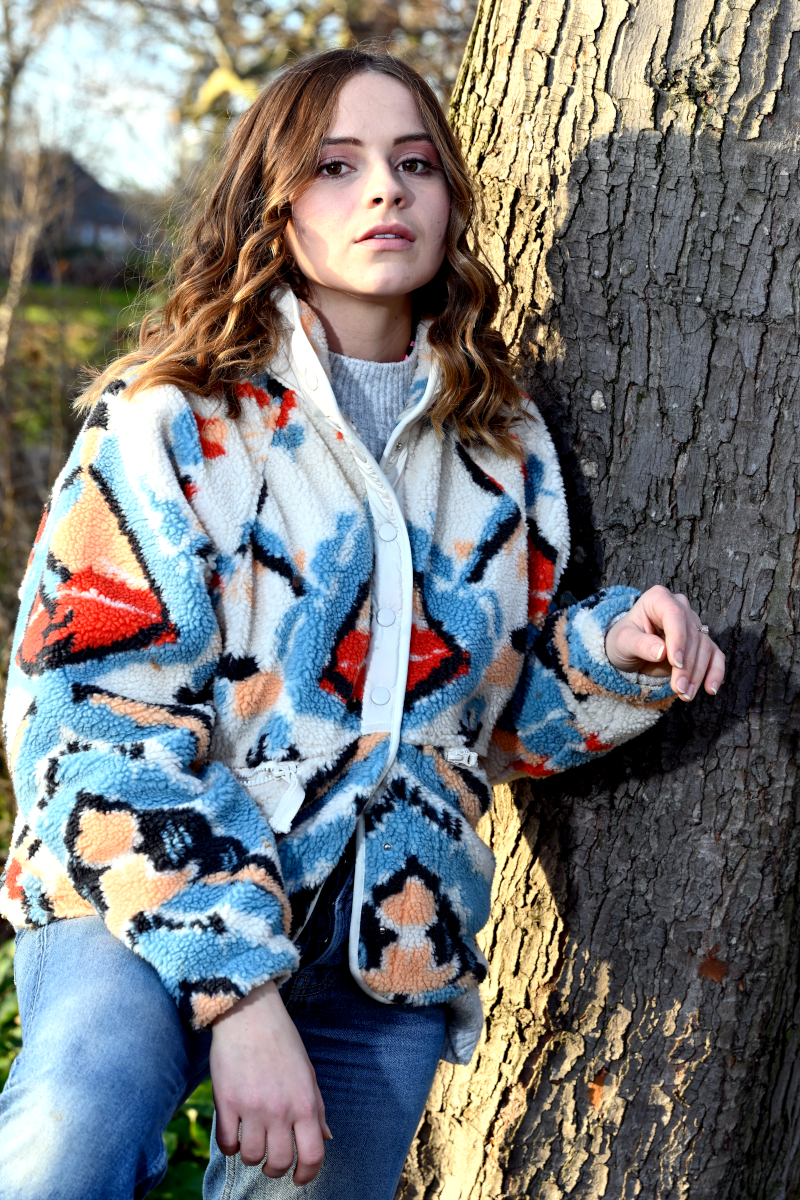
- Aplin in 2019

Background information
- Born: Gabrielle Ann Aplin; 10 October 1992 (age 34); Chippenham, Wiltshire, England
- Origin: Sutton Benger, Wiltshire
- Genres: Folk; indie folk; indie rock; synthpop; pop
- Occupations: Musician; singer-songwriter
- Instruments: Vocals; guitar; piano
- Years active: 2008–present
- Labels: Never Fade; Parlophone; BA1 Records; Warner Bros
- Website: www.gabrielleaplin.com

Gabrielle Ann Aplin (born 10 October 1992) is an English singer-songwriter. After amassing a following for her acoustic music covers on YouTube, Aplin signed a recording deal with Parlophone in February 2012. She rose to prominence the following November when she was selected to record the soundtrack for a John Lewis television commercial with a cover of Frankie Goes to Hollywood's "The Power of Love", which went on to top the UK Singles Chart.

Her debut album, English Rain, was released in May 2013 to positive reviews. It debuted at number two on the UK Album Chart and led to more singles: "Please Don't Say You Love Me", "Panic Cord", "Home" and "Salvation". English Rain has since been certified Gold in the UK, selling over 100,000 copies. Aplin's second album, Light Up the Dark, was released in September 2015, followed by the release of her third album, Dear Happy, in January 2020. She has also released multiple extended plays throughout her career.

Her fourth album, Phosphorescent, was released in January 2023.

== Early life ==
Aplin grew up in Chippenham in Wiltshire. She is the eldest of three children. Aplin's parents bought her her first guitar when she was 11 years old. She is a fan of the singer-songwriters Bob Dylan and Leonard Cohen, as well as the rock band The National. Aplin went on to study music at Bath College, participating in the college's in-house label, BA1 Records.

== Music career ==
=== Career beginnings (2011–2012) ===
Aplin's first release was the five-track Acoustic EP, which she self-released under her own label, Never Fade Records, on 13 September 2010. Her second release, another extended play titled Never Fade, was released on 9 May 2011. In this EP, she expanded her sound, showcasing a more folk rock sound and playing all the instruments herself. In April 2011, Aplin was invited to perform for BBC Introducing at Maida Vale Studios, where she played three tracks from Never Fade and a cover of the Coldplay song "Fix You," which was the most-viewed video on the BBC Introducing YouTube channel. Aplin released her third EP, Home, on 12 February 2012, again under Never Fade Records. She described Home as "the most honest thing I've ever written and recorded."

=== English Rain and Light Up the Dark (2012–2016) ===
On 29 February 2012, Aplin announced that she had signed a deal with Parlophone Records. Later that year, Aplin was confirmed as the soundtrack to the John Lewis & Partners Christmas advert covering Frankie Goes to Hollywood's "The Power of Love". The song went on to top the UK Singles Chart in December 2012. Her first major label single titled "Please Don't Say You Love Me" was released on 10 February 2013. On 13 May 2013, Aplin released her debut album, English Rain. Following its release, English Rain charted at number two on both the UK and Scottish album charts, selling over 35,000 copies. It also reached the top ten in Australia, number 11 in Ireland, and number 39 in New Zealand.

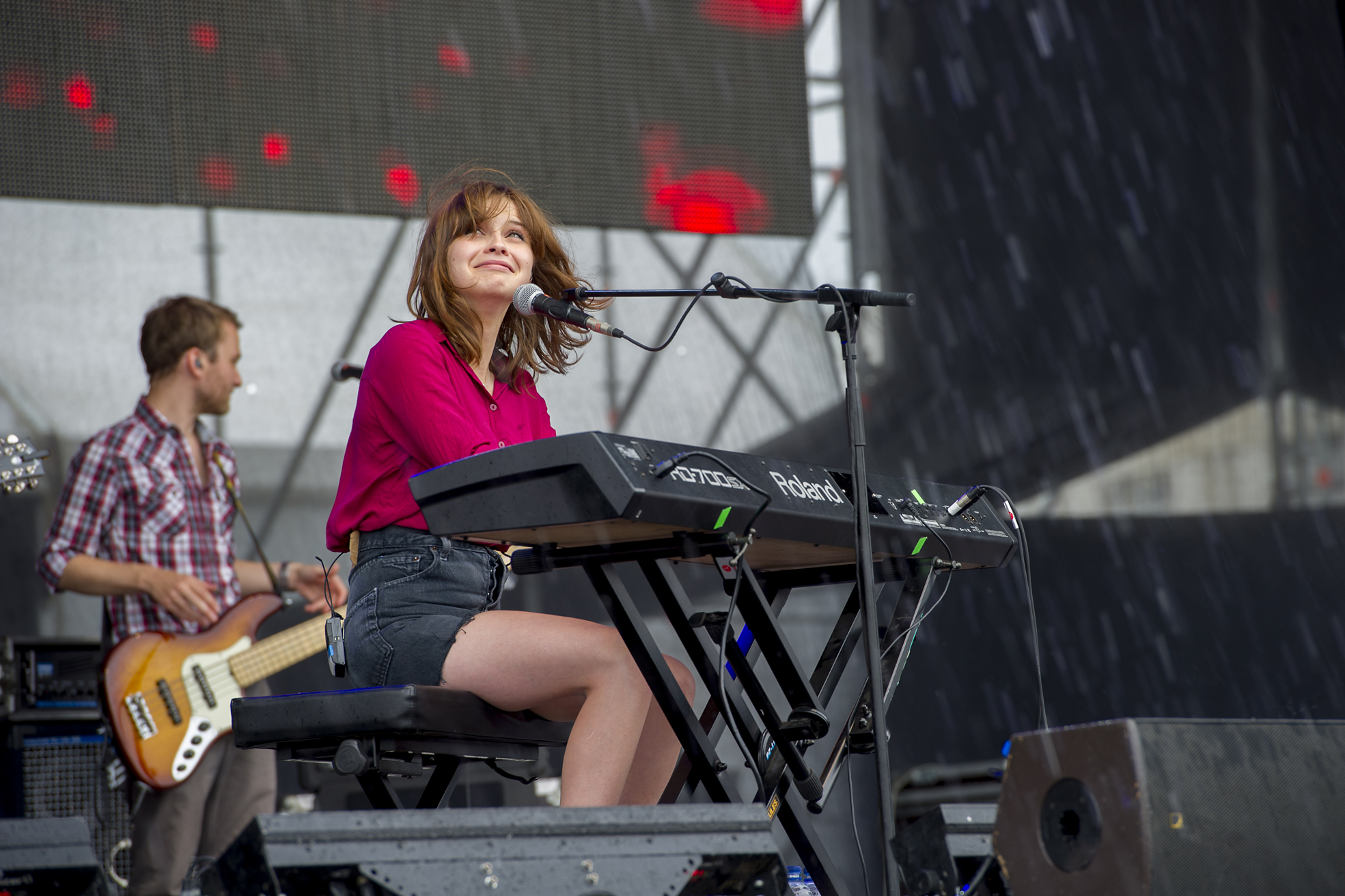
Aplin at the Gibraltar Music Festival in 2013

In 2013, Aplin's record label, Never Fade Records, signed Welsh folk-jazz singer Hannah Grace, who had previously supported Aplin on tour, and indie folk artist Saint Raymond to deals. Never Fade Records' first release since Aplin's own extended play Home in February 2012 was Saint Raymond's extended play Escapade on 22 April 2013. Saint Raymond has since departed Never Fade Records.

In May 2015, Aplin announced her second studio album, Light Up the Dark. The album announcement also featured the release of the title track's music video. The video for the second single from Light Up the Dark, "Sweet Nothing," was released on 6 August 2015. The album itself was released on 18 September 2015. In September of the same year, it was reported that she had signed a deal with Storm Management, a modelling agency.

In 2016, Aplin gained popularity in Brazil when her song "Home" was used in the popular telenovela Totalmente Demais. Aplin visited Brazil in May to make a cameo appearance in the final episode of the show. Following her appearance and a live performance on Domingão do Faustão, "Home" reached number 1 on the Brazilian iTunes chart, marking Aplin's fourth number 1 single worldwide. On 26 June, Aplin played at the Glastonbury Festival on the Acoustic stage and then on the BBC Introducing stage.

=== Extended plays and Dear Happy (2016–present) ===
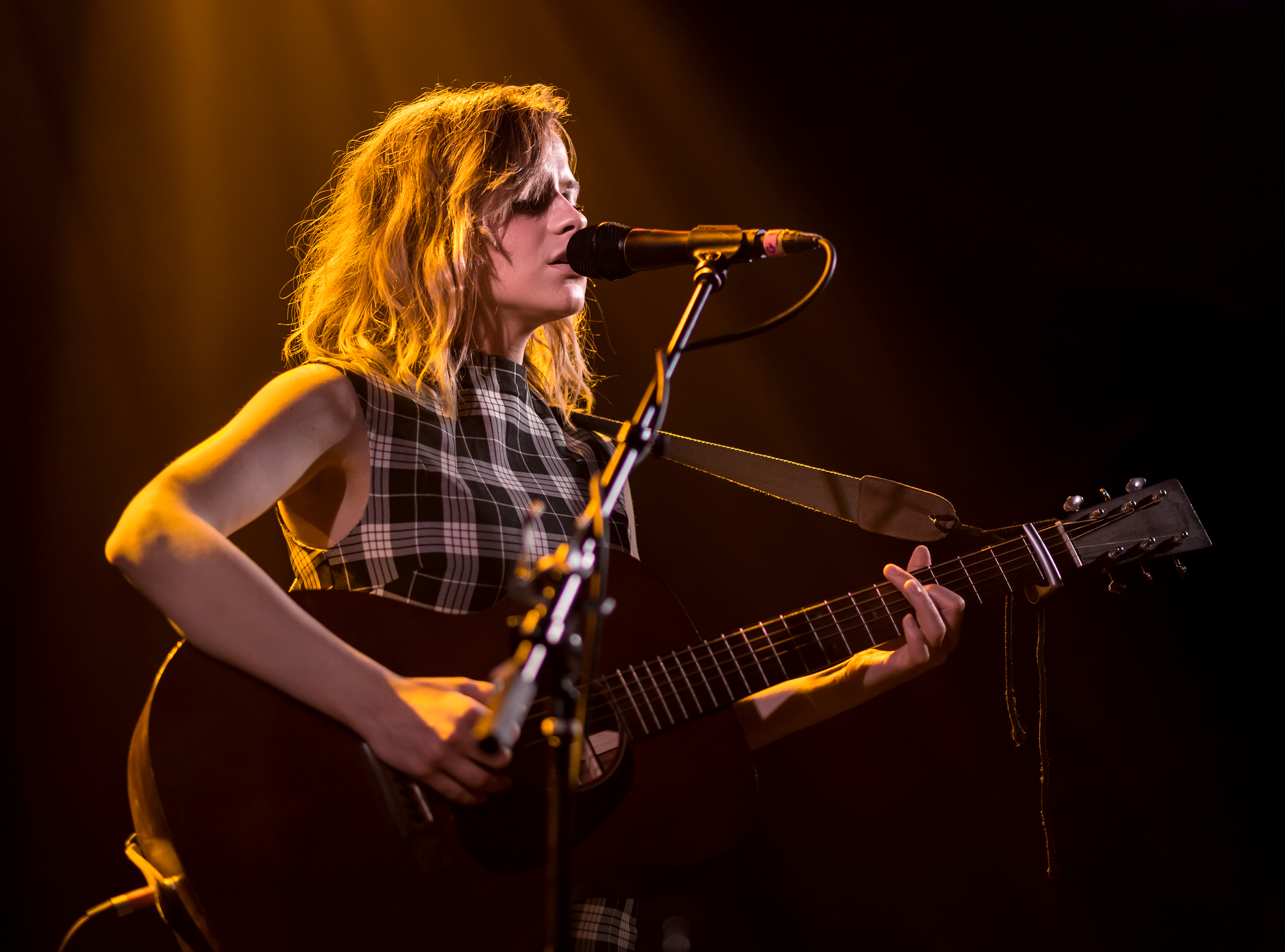
Aplin performing at The Troubadour in Los Angeles in 2018

On 9 November 2016, Aplin released "Miss You", the first single from the extended play of the same name. The song has been described as a departure from her previously guitar-driven sound on Light Up the Dark, and the production as being much less 'bare bones' than her previous efforts.

In February 2017, Aplin parted ways with Parlophone Records to focus on releasing material via her own independent record label, Never Fade Records. She said of the decision, "I really enjoy getting involved with everything—from my image to my artwork. It's been quite nice to be in control." Aplin released a single titled "Waking Up Slow" on 9 August 2017. She then released her next EP, Avalon, on 6 October. "Waking Up Slow" was lauded as one of the best pop songs of 2017 by Popjustice.

Aplin announced the first single from her third album, "My Mistake", on 20 November 2018; it was released on 28 November, with Aplin describing it as her "most honest and raw song to date". Aplin collaborated with Hannah Grace on a Christmas extended play titled December, which was released on 4 December 2018. On 27 March 2019, Aplin released the second single titled "Nothing Really Matters" from her third album, followed by another single titled "Losing Me", which features English singer JP Cooper, on 14 August. The album, titled Dear Happy, was released on 17 January 2020.

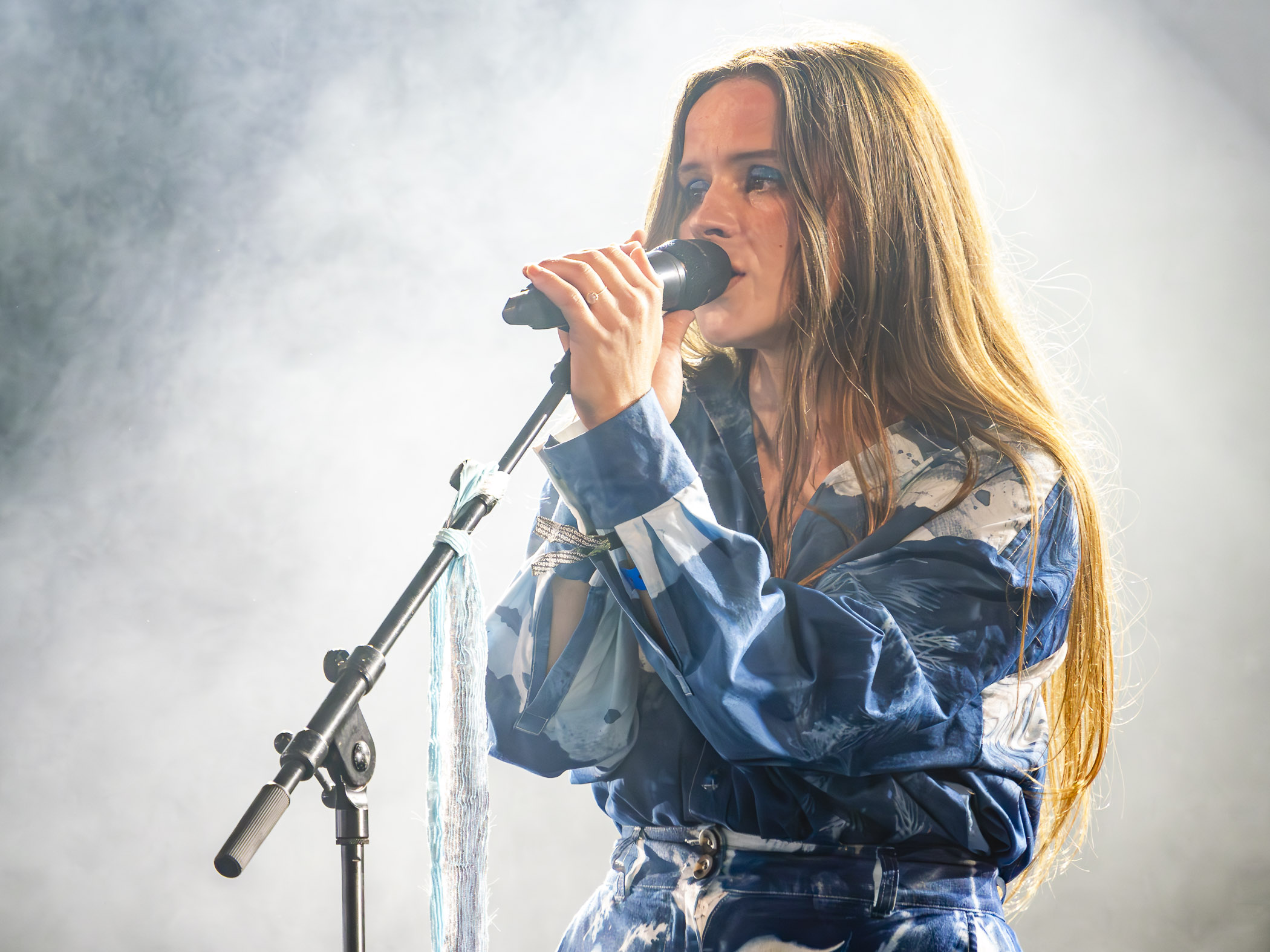
Gabrielle Aplin performing at Glastonbury Festival in June 2023

Her fourth album, Phosphorescent, was released on 6 January 2023 on Never Fade Records. Her song "Never Be the Same" from Phosphorescent was featured in the third episode of season 1 of Heartstopper, streaming on Netflix.

In 2021, Aplin's song 'Home' was featured in the video game Life Is Strange: True Colors.

== Personal life ==
Aplin is vegan. She is in a relationship with musician Alfie Hudson-Taylor. The couple live in Somerset.

== Discography ==
- English Rain (2013)
- Light Up the Dark (2015)
- Dear Happy (2020)
- Phosphorescent (2023)
