= Never Fade Records =

UK independent record label

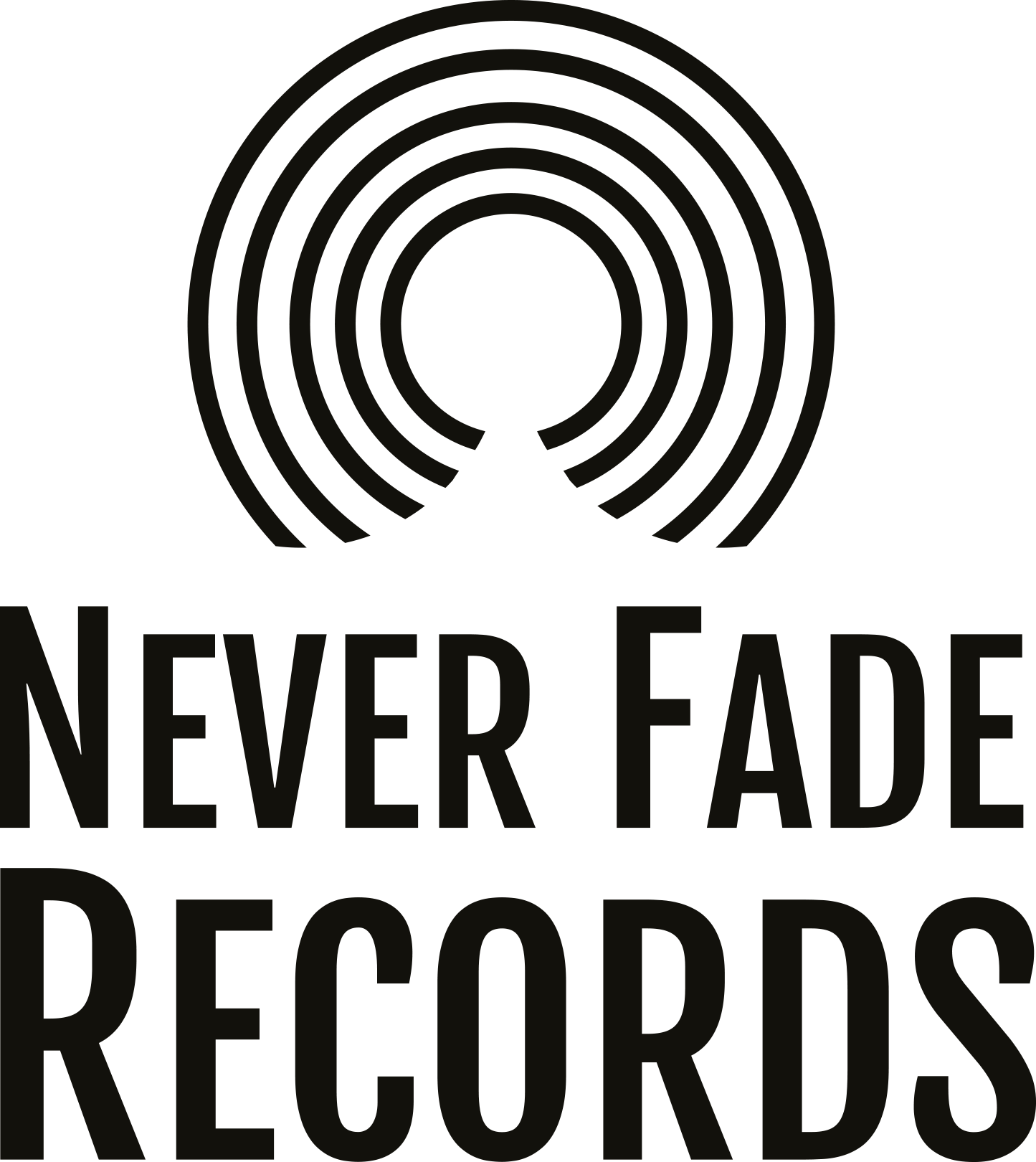
- Founded: 2010
- Founder: James Barnes; Gabrielle Aplin
- Genre: singer-songwriter
- Country of origin: United Kingdom
- Location: London
- Official website: neverfaderecords.com

Never Fade Records is an independent record label founded in 2010 by Gabrielle Aplin and James Barnes and based in London.

Initially founded as a way for Aplin to self release her music, Never Fade now develops new artists and is home to other established acts such as Saint Raymond and Hannah Grace. Never Fade Records is named after one of Gabrielle’s songs of the same name.

== History ==
Aplin released her first three EP’s on Never Fade Records: Acoustic EP, Never Fade EP and Home EP. Together, they have sold in excess of 100k copies and led to Gabrielle signing a record deal with Parlophone records in 2012.

At the start of 2013 it was announced that Nottingham based indie artist, Saint Raymond who had previously supported Gabrielle on her European tour, would be the next artist to release music through Never Fade Records. Never Fade released Saint Raymond's debut EP Escapade in May 2013. The lead track from Escapade EP "Fall At Your Feet" was chosen as an iTunes single of the week upon its release. Escapade EP was a success, selling over 20k copies and leading to Saint Raymond catching the eye of several record labels before eventually signing to Asylum Records in August 2013.

In 2013 it was reported that Welsh singer-songwriter Hannah Grace would be supporting Aplin on her English Rain UK tour and releasing her music on Never Fade. Hannah Grace released her EP Meant to Be Kind in April 2014. In an interview Grace said "Gabrielle and myself have been good friends for a while. We met through friends and playing music. She asked me to support her on tour in March 2013 and to also join her singing backing vocals in November 2013. She’s always supported my music and I was delighted when she gave me the opportunity to release my first EP on her label."

In February 2017, Sonny a soul singer from South Shields announced that he would be releasing his EP 'Hopeless Romance' on Never Fade Records.

== Never Fade Sessions ==
Along with releasing music, Never Fade Records also runs live music events. In January 2016 Never Fade Records began running 'The Never Fade Sessions' a monthly club night held on the last Monday of every month at historic music venue 'The Social' in London. The club night which is described as "an intimate evening of live and stripped back performances" hosts several performers per night and in the past acts such as - Newton Faulkner, Ward Thomas Lewis Watson, Hudson Taylor and Nina Nesbitt have performed. Never Fade Records host a Christmas show at Union Chapel, Islington in London and also curate stages at festivals including The Great Escape Festival, Barn On The Farm Festival and Boardmasters Festival.

== Discography ==
- Gabrielle Aplin - "Acoustic EP" (2010)
- Gabrielle Aplin - "Never Fade EP" (2011)
- Gabrielle Aplin - "Home EP" (2012)
- Saint Raymond - "Escapade EP" (2013)
- Hannah Grace - "Meant To Be Kind" (2014)
- Bite The Buffalo - "Polka Dots" Single (2014)
- Hannah Grace - "Mustang" EP (2016)
- Gabrielle Aplin - "Miss You" EP (2017)
- Sonny - "Hopeless Romance" EP (2017)
- Hannah Grace - "Praise You" Single (2017)
- Anna Straker - "Ignite Me" Single (2017)
- Gabrielle Aplin - "Avalon" EP (2017)
- Saint Raymond - "A Light That Blinds" (2017)
- Sonny - "Yesterday's Gone" Single (2017)
- Anna Straker - "Wannabe" (2017)
- Hannah Grace - “Oh River” Single (2018)
- Sonny - “Northern Nights” EP (2018)
- Saint Raymond - “Three” EP (2018)
- Gabrielle Aplin - “My Mistake” (2018)
- Gabrielle Aplin & Hannah Grace - “December” EP (2018)
- Hannah Grace - “With You” Single (2019)
- Nick Wilson - “Think Twice” Single (2019)
- Sonny “Beech Road” EP (2019)
- Nick Wilson “Let Me Hold You” 2019
- Gabrielle Aplin “Nothing Really Matters” (2019)
- Hannah Grace “Bed You Made” EP (2019)
- Nick Wilson “Colour Me In” 2019
