= The Script discography =

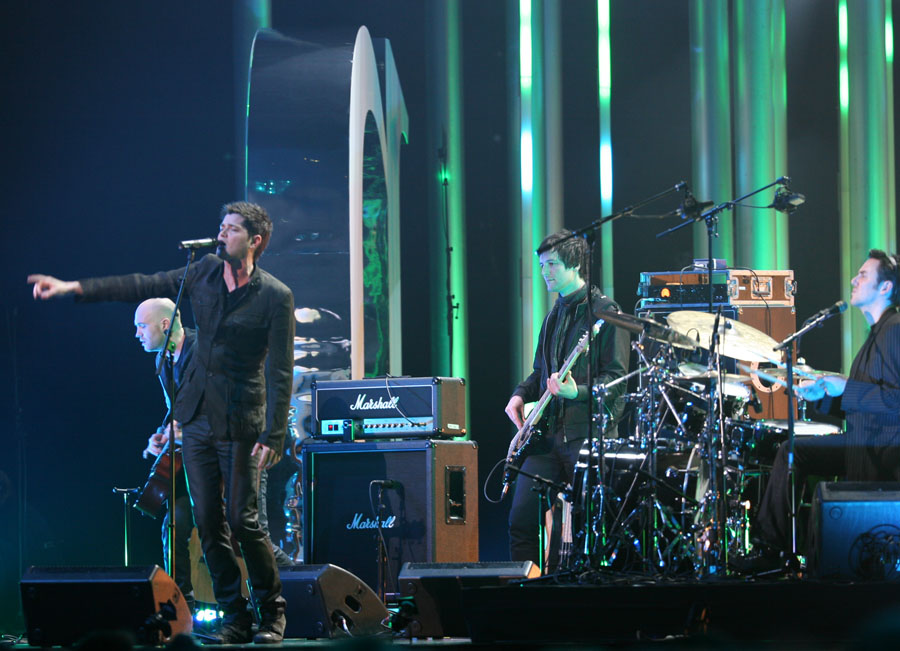
- The Script performing at the 2008 Nobel Peace Prize Concert
- Studio albums: 8
- Extended plays: 6
- Compilation albums: 2
- Singles: 29
- Music videos: 25

Irish pop rock band the Script has released eight studio albums, six EPs, 29 singles and 25 music videos.

The Script released their debut self-titled studio album, The Script, in 2008. The album went to number one in both Ireland and the United Kingdom. It also reached the top ten in Australia and Sweden, and peaked at number 19 on the US Top Heatseekers chart.

The Script's debut single, "We Cry", peaked in the top 10 of the Irish and Danish charts. It was followed by their most successful single from their first album, "The Man Who Can't Be Moved", which reached number two on the Irish, Danish and UK singles charts. "Breakeven" was then released; peaking at number three in Australia and number 10 in Ireland.

== Albums ==
=== Studio albums ===
List of albums, with selected chart positions and certifications
Title	Album details	Peak chart positions										Certifications
Title	Album details	IRE	AUS	DEN	GER	NLD	NZ	SWE	SWI	UK	US	Certifications
The Script	Released: 8 August 2008; Label: Phonogenic, RCA; Formats: CD, digital download	1	9	15	32	25	15	6	16	1	64	IRMA: 5× Platinum; ARIA: Platinum; BPI: 4× Platinum; RMNZ: Gold
Science & Faith	Released: 10 September 2010; Label: Phonogenic, RCA, Sony Music; Formats: CD, digital download	1	2	23	40	14	15	52	15	1	3	IRMA: 5× Platinum; ARIA: Platinum; BPI: 2× Platinum; RMNZ: Platinum
#3	Released: 7 September 2012; Label: Phonogenic, Sony Music; Formats: CD, digital download	1	9	32	11	8	11	59	4	2	13	IRMA: Platinum; ARIA: Gold; BPI: 2× Platinum; IFPI DEN: Platinum; RMNZ: 4× Platinum
No Sound Without Silence	Released: 12 September 2014; Label: Phonogenic, Sony Music; Formats: CD, digital download	1	5	11	12	3	1	20	2	1	10	ARIA: Gold; BPI: Platinum; IFPI DEN: Gold; NVPI: Gold; RMNZ: 2× Platinum
Freedom Child	Released: 1 September 2017; Label: Phonogenic, Sony Music; Formats: CD, digital download	1	5	26	43	3	17	27	10	1	58	BPI: Gold
Sunsets & Full Moons	Released: 8 November 2019; Label: Phonogenic, Sony Music; Formats: CD, digital download	1	11	—	92	8	—	—	28	1	—	BPI: Gold
Satellites	Released: 16 August 2024; Label: BMG Rights Management; Formats: CD, digital download, streaming	1	—	—	91	9	—	—	67	2	—	
The User's Guide to Being Human	Released: 14 August 2026; Label: BMG Rights Management; Formats: CD, digital download, streaming	1	42	—	—	25	—	—	78	3	—	
"—" denotes a recording that did not chart or was not released in that territory.

=== Compilation albums ===
List of compilation albums
Title	Album details	Peak chart positions				Certifications
Title	Album details	IRE	AUS	NLD	UK	Certifications
Tales from the Script: Greatest Hits	Released: 1 October 2021; Label: Phonogenic, Sony Music; Formats: CD, digital download, streaming	1	16	83	1	ARIA: Platinum; BPI: Gold

== Extended plays ==
Title	EP details
iTunes Festival: London 2008	Released: 25 July 2008; Label: Sony BMG Music Entertainment UK; Format: Digital download
iTunes Session	Released: 11 May 2010; Label: Sony Music Entertainment UK; Formats: Digital download
iTunes Festival: London 2011	Released: 11 July 2011; Label: Sony Music Entertainment UK; Formats: Digital download
Acoustic Sessions	Released: 18 April 2018; Label: Sony Music Entertainment UK; Formats: Digital download
Acoustic Sessions 2	Released: 17 March 2021; Label: Sony Music Entertainment UK; Formats: Digital download
Acoustic Sessions 3	Released: 17 March 2022; Label: Sony Music Entertainment UK; Formats: Digital download

== Singles ==
List of singles, with selected chart positions and certifications, showing year released and album name
Title	Year	Peak chart positions										Certifications	Album
Title	Year	IRE	AUS	AUT	DEN	GER	NLD	NZ	SWI	UK	US	Certifications	Album
"We Cry"	2008	9	82	—	6	61	— (Note: "We Cry" did not enter the Dutch Top 40, but peaked at number twelve on the Dutch Tipparade chart, which acts as an extension to the Dutch Top 40.)	—	56	15	—	BPI: Silver	The Script
"The Man Who Can't Be Moved"	2008	2	44	33	2	28	19	19	17	2	86	ARIA: 2× Platinum; BPI: 5× Platinum; BVMI: Gold; IFPI DEN: 2× Platinum; RIAA: Platinum; RMNZ: 4× Platinum	The Script
"Breakeven"	2008	10	3	75	—	71	— (Note: "Breakeven" did not enter the Dutch Top 40, but peaked at number four on the Dutch Tipparade chart, which acts as an extension to the Dutch Top 40.)	—	66	21	12	ARIA: 5× Platinum; BPI: 3× Platinum; BVMI: Gold; IFPI DEN: Platinum; RIAA: 2× Platinum; RMNZ: 5× Platinum	The Script
"Talk You Down"	2009	19	—	—	—	—	—	—	—	47	—		The Script
"Before the Worst"	2009	37	10	—	—	—	—	22	—	96	—	ARIA: Platinum	The Script
"For the First Time"	2010	1	12	—	39	83	16	20	37	4	23	ARIA: 2× Platinum; BPI: Platinum; IFPI DEN: Gold; RIAA: Platinum; RMNZ: Platinum	Science & Faith
"Nothing"	2010	15	50	—	—	—	12	32	—	42	32	ARIA: Platinum; BPI: Silver; RIAA: Gold; RMNZ: Gold	Science & Faith
"If You Ever Come Back"	2011	—	47	—	—	—	29	29	—	115	—	ARIA: Gold; RMNZ: Gold	Science & Faith
"Science & Faith"	2011	—	—	—	—	—	—	—	—	—	—		Science & Faith
"Hall of Fame" (featuring will.i.am)	2012	1	4	1	11	2	17	3	3	1	25	ARIA: 10× Platinum; BPI: 4× Platinum; BVMI: 2× Platinum; IFPI AUT: Gold; IFPI DEN: 4× Platinum; IFPI SWI: 2× Platinum; NVPI: Gold; RIAA: 2× Platinum; RMNZ: 6× Platinum	#3
"Six Degrees of Separation"	2012	25	31	—	—	—	32	26	—	32	—	ARIA: Platinum; BPI: Silver	#3
"If You Could See Me Now"	2013	13	34	16	—	45	21	11	—	20	—	ARIA: Platinum; BPI: Gold; IFPI DEN: Platinum; RMNZ: Platinum	#3
"Millionaires"	2013	74	—	—	—	—	— (Note: "Millionaires" did not enter the Dutch Top 40, but peaked at number two on the Dutch Tipparade chart, which acts as an extension to the Dutch Top 40.)	—	—	91	—		#3
"Superheroes"	2014	1	7	9	31	8	4	14	8	3	73	ARIA: 3× Platinum; BPI: 2× Platinum; BVMI: Platinum; IFPI DEN: Platinum; RIAA: Gold; RMNZ: 2× Platinum	No Sound Without Silence
"No Good in Goodbye"	2014	62	93	—	—	—	35	—	69	26	—	BPI: Silver	No Sound Without Silence
"Man on a Wire"	2015	—	—	—	—	—	— (Note: "Man on a Wire" did not enter the Dutch Top 40, but peaked at number nine on the Dutch Tipparade chart, which acts as an extension to the Dutch Top 40.)	—	—	150	—		No Sound Without Silence
"Rain"	2017	13	—	63	—	—	3	—	87	15	—	BPI: Platinum; NVPI: Platinum	Freedom Child
"Arms Open"	2017	—	—	—	—	—	30	—	—	—	—		Freedom Child
"Freedom Child"	2018	—	—	—	—	—	—	—	—	—	—		Freedom Child
"The Last Time"	2019	29	— (Note: "The Last Time" did not enter the ARIA Singles Chart, but peaked at number 14 on the ARIA Digital Track Chart.)	—	—	—	13	— (Note: "The Last Time" did not enter the NZ Top 40 Singles Chart, but peaked at number 18 on the NZ Hot Singles Chart.)	95	32	—	BPI: Gold	Sunsets & Full Moons
"Something Unreal"	2019	—	—	—	—	—	37	—	—	—	—		Sunsets & Full Moons
"Run Through Walls"	2020	—	—	—	—	—	—	—	—	—	—		Sunsets & Full Moons
"I Want It All"	2021	—	—	—	—	—	32	—	—	—	—		Tales from the Script: Greatest Hits
"Dare You to Doubt Me"	2022	—	—	—	—	—	— (Note: "Dare You to Doubt Me" did not enter the Dutch Top 40, but peaked at number 24 on the Dutch Tipparade chart, which acts as an extension to the Dutch Top 40.)	—	—	—	—		Non-album single
"Both Ways"	2024	—	—	—	—	—	—	—	—	—	—		Satellites
"At Your Feet"	2024	—	—	—	—	—	—	—	—	—	—		Satellites
"Inside Out"	2025	—	—	—	—	—	—	—	—	—	—		Satellites
"Man in the Arena"	2026	—	—	—	—	—	—	—	—	—	—		The User's Guide to Being Human
"The Crowd Was Singing Wonderwall"	2026	—	—	—	—	—	—	—	—	—	—		The User's Guide to Being Human
"—" denotes a recording that did not chart or was not released in that territory.

== Other charted and certified songs ==
List of non-single songs, with selected chart positions, showing year released and album name
Title	Year	Peak chart positions						Certifications	Album
Title	Year	IRE	FRA	GER	NL	NZ	UK	Certifications	Album
"You Won't Feel a Thing"	2010	48	—	—	—	—	113		Science & Faith
"It's Not Right for You"	2014	40	—	—	—	—	49		No Sound Without Silence
"Hail Rain or Sunshine"	2014	—	—	—	—	34	—		No Sound Without Silence
"Never Seen Anything Quite Like You"	2014	—	—	—	—	—	—	BPI: Silver; RMNZ: Gold	No Sound Without Silence
"Paint the Town Green"	2014	—	—	—	—	8	—	RMNZ: Platinum	No Sound Without Silence
"Goodbye Friend" (David Guetta featuring The Script)	2014	—	142	93	—	—	—		Listen

== Music videos ==
Title	Year	Director
"We Cry"	2008	Charles Mehling
"The Man Who Can't Be Moved"	2008	Marc Klasfeld
"Breakeven"	2008	Charles Mehling
"Talk You Down"	2009	Charles Mehling
"Before the Worst"	2009	Paul Minor
"For the First Time"	2010	Charles Mehling
"Nothing"	2010	Charles Mehling
"If You Ever Come Back"	2011	Charles Mehling
"Science & Faith"	2011	Ethan Lader
"Hall of Fame (featuring will.i.am)"	2012	Ethan Lader
"Six Degrees of Separation"	2012	Phil Harder
"If You Could See Me Now"	2013	Paul Banks
"Millionaires"	2013	Paul Banks
"Superheroes"	2014	Vaughan Arnell
"No Good in Goodbye"	2014	Charlie Lightning
"Man on a Wire"	2015	Frank Borin
"Rain"	2017	Calmatic
"Arms Open"	2017	Frank Borin
"The Last Time"	2019	Charles Mehling
"Run Through Walls"	2020	Charles Mehling
"I Want It All"	2021	Charles Mehling
"Dare You To Doubt Me"	2022	Danny O'Donaghue & Peter Neill
"Both Ways"	2024	Jordan Rossi
"Man In the Arena"	2026	Charles Mehling
"The Crowd Was Singing Wonderwall"	2026	Charles Mehling

== Covers ==
- "Lose Yourself" by Eminem in the Live Lounge (live)
- "Times Like These" by Foo Fighters
- "Written in the Stars" by Tinie Tempah at the Aviva Stadium (live)
- "Anything Could Happen" by Ellie Goulding in the Live Lounge
- "Stay" by Rihanna from the Radio 1 Academy in Derry (live)
- "Babylon" by David Gray
- "Heroes" by David Bowie in Like A Virgin radio (live)
- "Part-Time Lover" by Stevie Wonder with Kelly Rowland
- "Chandelier" by Sia
- "Drive" by The Cars
- "Dancing in the Dark" by Bruce Springsteen (live at UNTOLD 2021)
