= Tales from the Script: Greatest Hits =

Greatest hits album by The Script
- Released: 1 October 2021
- Recorded: 2008–2021
- Length: 69:36
- Labels: Phonogenic; Sony
- Producers: Andrew Frampton; David Lucius King; Steve Kipner; Danny O'Donoghue; Mark Sheehan

The Script chronology
Acoustic Sessions 2 (2021)	Tales from the Script: Greatest Hits (2021)	Acoustic Sessions 3 (2022)

Singles from Tales from the Script: Greatest Hits
- 1. "I Want It All" Released: 27 August 2021

Tales from the Script: Greatest Hits is the first greatest hits album by Irish pop rock band The Script. It was released on 1 October 2021 through Phonogenic Records and Sony Music Entertainment. The album includes singles from all six of the band's preceding studio albums, as well as a brand new song, and a song from their 2018 Acoustic Sessions EP. It was preceded by the single "I Want It All", and was supported by a worldwide tour which took place throughout 2022 and spanned North America, Europe and Australia.

The album debuted at number one in the albums charts in both Ireland and the UK.

== Commercial performance ==
Tales from the Script: Greatest Hits debuted at number one on the UK Albums Chart dated 8 October 2021, becoming the Script's sixth UK number-one album. It also debuted atop the Irish Albums Chart, becoming the band's seventh chart-topping album in their home country and extending their unbroken string of number-one albums there.

== Promotion ==
=== Tales from the Script – Greatest Hits Tour ===
Tales From The Script – Greatest Hits Tour (2022)
- Tour by The Script
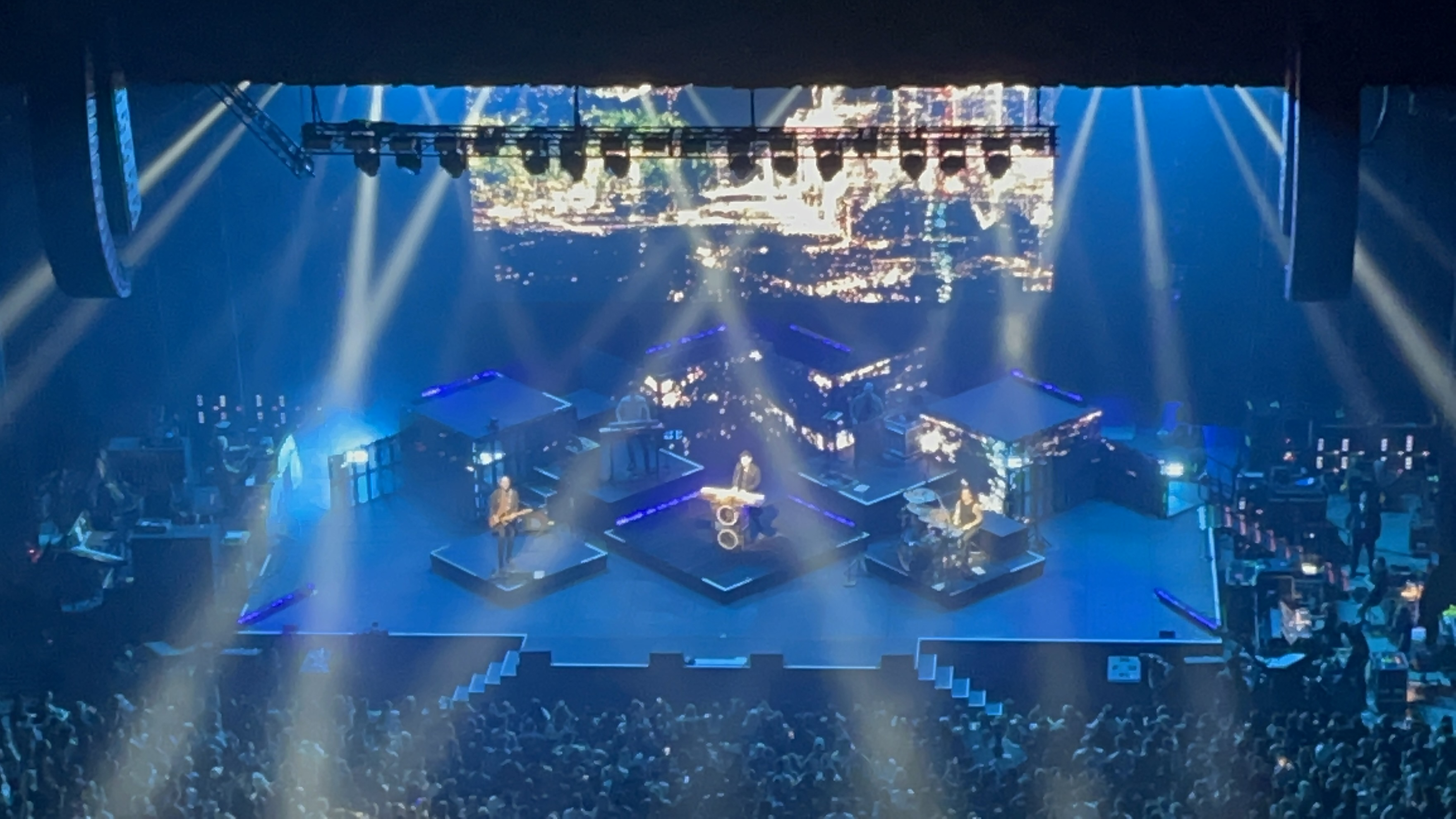
- The Script performing "Before the Worst" in Sydney on 16 September 2022.
- Location: Europe; North America; Australia
- Associated album: Tales From The Script - Greatest Hits
- Start date: 30 March 2022
- End date: 18 November 2022
- Legs: 4
- No. of shows: 53

The Script concert chronology
- Sunsets & Full Moons Tour (2020); Tales From The Script – Greatest Hits Tour (2022)

List of confirmed dates and venues
Date	City	Country	Venue	Supporting act
North America
30 March 2022	Los Angeles	California	Wiltern Theatre	Calum Scott
31 March 2022	San Francisco	California	The Warfield	Calum Scott
1 April 2022	Las Vegas	Nevada	House of Blues	Calum Scott
3 April 2022	Denver	Colorado	Mission Ballroom	Calum Scott
5 April 2022	Minneapolis	Minnesota	State Theatre (Minneapolis)	Calum Scott
6 April 2022	Milwaukee	Wisconsin	Riverside Theater (Milwaukee)	Calum Scott
7 April 2022	Chicago	Illinois	Riviera Theatre	Calum Scott
9 April 2022	Royal Oak, Michigan	Michigan	Royal Oak Music Theatre	Calum Scott
10 April 2022	Toronto	Ontario	Massey Hall	Calum Scott
12 April 2022	Philadelphia	Pennsylvania	The Fillmore	Calum Scott
13 April 2022	Philadelphia	Pennsylvania	The Fillmore	Calum Scott
14 April 2022	New York City	New York	Radio City Music Hall	Calum Scott
Europe				Calum Scott
14 May 2022	Belfast	Northern Ireland	SSE Arena, Belfast	Ella Henderson
15 May 2022	Belfast	Northern Ireland	SSE Arena, Belfast	Ella Henderson
19 May 2022	Liverpool	England	M&S Bank Arena	Ella Henderson
20 May 2022	Leeds	England	First Direct Arena	Ella Henderson
21 May 2022	Manchester	England	AO Arena	Ella Henderson
23 May 2022	Cardiff	Wales	Motorpoint Arena Cardiff	Ella Henderson
24 May 2022	Nottingham	England	Motorpoint Arena Nottingham	Ella Henderson
26 May 2022	Aberdeen	Scotland	P&J Live	Ella Henderson
27 May 2022	Glasgow	Scotland	OVO Hydro	Ella Henderson
28 May 2022	Newcastle	England	Utilita Arena Newcastle	Ella Henderson
30 May 2022	Brighton	England	Brighton Centre	Ella Henderson
31 May 2022	Bournemouth	England	Bournemouth International Centre	Ella Henderson
2 June 2022	Sheffield	England	Utilita Arena Sheffield	Ella Henderson
3 June 2022	Birmingham	England	Utilita Arena Birmingham	Ella Henderson
4 June 2022	London	England	The O2	Ella Henderson
7 June 2022	Brussels	Belgium	Forest National	Ella Henderson
10 June 2022	Amsterdam	Netherlands	Ziggo Dome	Ella Henderson
11 June 2022	Amsterdam	Netherlands	Ziggo Dome	Ella Henderson
14 June 2022	Dublin	Ireland	3Arena	Ella Henderson
15 June 2022	Dublin	Ireland	3Arena	Ella Henderson
19 June 2022	Cork	Ireland	Musgrave Park, Cork	Ella Henderson
6 July 2022	Henley-on-Thames	England	Henley Festival	TBA
14 July 2022	Scarborough	England	Scarborough Open Air Theatre	TBA
15 July 2022	Newmarket	England	Newmarket Racecourse	TBA
16 July 2022	Edinburgh	Scotland	Edinburgh Castle	TBA
27 August 2022	Devon	England	Powderham Castle	TBA
Leg 3 — Australia
15 September 2022	Brisbane	Australia	Riverstage	Conrad Sewell
16 September 2022	Sydney	Australia	Aware Super Theatre	Conrad Sewell
17 September 2022	Melbourne	Australia	Sidney Myer Music Bowl	Conrad Sewell
20 September 2022	Perth	Australia	RAC Arena	Conrad Sewell
Leg 4 — Europe
2 November 2022	Stockholm	Sweden	Berns Salonger	TBA
3 November 2022	Oslo	Norway	Sentrum Scene	TBA
4 November 2022	Copenhagen	Denmark	VEGA	TBA
6 November 2022	Hamburg	Germany	Uebel & Gefährlich	TBA
7 November 2022	Wiesbaden	Germany	Schlachthof	TBA
9 November 2022	Zürich	Switzerland	Samsung Hall	TBA
10 November 2022	Munich	Germany	Neue Theaterfabrik	TBA
11 November 2022	Stuttgart	Germany	LKA Longhorn	TBA
12 November 2022	Milan	Italy	Fabrique	TBA
14 November 2022	Paris	France	Le Trianon	TBA
15 November 2022	Cologne	Germany	Carlswerk Victoria	TBA
17 November 2022	Madrid	Spain	La Riviera	TBA
18 November 2022	Lisbon	Portugal	Campo Pequeno	TBA

^{a} Mark Sheehan was absent from the band's North America leg due to wanting to spend time with his family.

== Track listing ==
All Songs written by Danny O'Donoghue and Mark Sheehan except where indicated

Tales from the Script: Greatest Hits track listing
No.	Title	Writer(s)	Original album	Length
1.	"Breakeven"	O'Donoghue/Sheehan/Andrew Frampton/Steve Kipner	The Script	4:20
2.	"The Man Who Can't Be Moved"	O'Donoghue/Sheehan/Frampton/Kipner	The Script	4:00
3.	"For the First Time"	O'Donoghue/Sheehan/Glen Power	Science & Faith	4:12
4.	"Nothing"	O'Donoghue/Sheehan/Frampton/Kipner	Science & Faith	4:31
5.	"Hall of Fame" (featuring will.i.am)	O'Donoghue/Sheehan/James Barry	#3	3:22
6.	"If You Could See Me Now"	O'Donoghue/Sheehan/Frampton/Kipner	#3	3:38
7.	"Superheroes"	Barry/O'Donoghue/Sheehan/Frampton/Kipner	No Sound Without Silence	4:02
8.	"Six Degrees of Separation"	O'Donoghue/Sheehan/Frampton/Kipner	#3	3:52
9.	"Rain"	O'Donoghue/Sheehan/James Barry/Camille Purcell	Freedom Child	3:30
10.	"Arms Open"	Sheehan/Adam Messinger/O'Donoghue/Nasri Atweh	Freedom Child	4:02
11.	"The Last Time"	O'Donoghue/Sheehan/Barry/James Abrahart	Sunsets & Full Moons	3:17
12.	"Run Through Walls"	O'Donoghue/Sheehan/Barry/David King	Sunsets & Full Moons	3:28
13.	"Before the Worst"	O'Donoghue/Sheehan/Power	The Script	3:23
14.	"We Cry"	O'Donoghue/Sheehan/Frampton/Kipner/Power	The Script	3:44
15.	"Science & Faith"	O'Donoghue/Sheehan	Science & Faith	4:20
16.	"No Good in Goodbye"	O'Donoghue/Sheehan/Barry	No Sound Without Silence	5:08
17.	"Never Seen Anything 'Quite Like You'" (acoustic)	O'Donoghue/Sheehan/Barry	No Sound Without Silence	3:48
18.	"I Want It All"	O'Donoghue/Sheehan/Frampton/Kipner	Tales From The Script	3:07
Total length:				69:36

== Charts ==
=== Weekly charts ===
Weekly chart performance for Tales from the Script: Greatest Hits
Chart (2021)	Peak position
Australian Albums (ARIA)	16
Belgian Albums (Ultratop Flanders)	83
Dutch Albums (Album Top 100)	83
Irish Albums (Official Charts)	1
Scottish Albums (Official Charts)	1
UK Albums (Official Charts)	1

=== Year-end charts ===
Year-end chart performance for Tales from the Script: Greatest Hits
Chart (2022)	Position
UK Albums (OCC)	94

== Certifications ==
Certifications for Tales from the Script: Greatest Hits
Region	Certification	Certified units/sales
Australia (ARIA)	Platinum	70,000^{‡}
United Kingdom (BPI)	Platinum	300,000^{‡}
^{‡} Sales+streaming figures based on certification alone.
