= Science & Faith Tour =

2010–11 concert tour by the Script

- Tour by The Script
- Promotional poster for the Manila show
- Associated album: Science & Faith
- Start date: 9 September 2010
- End date: 13 December 2011
- Legs: 18
- No. of shows: 55 in Europe; 9 in Australia; 74 in North America; 6 in Asia; 2 in Africa; 147 total

The Script concert chronology
- Science & Faith Tour (2010–11); #3 World Tour (2012–13)

The Science & Faith Tour was a world tour by Irish alternative rock band The Script. The tour supported their second album Science & Faith which was released on 13 September 2010.

== Background ==
The tour began to a sellout crowd at the University of Liverpool on 11 September 2010 and was followed by a six date theatre tour of The United Kingdom. The band then put on two shows in Australia, one in Sydney and the other in Melbourne. On 19 October 2010 the band began the first North American leg of the tour in San Diego's House of Blues. The first North American tour which visited The United States only ended in Boston's House of Blues. On 4 December 2010 the band took part in The Jingle Bell Ball in London's O_{2} Arena alongside artists including Black Eyed Peas and Nicole Scherzinger. Following this they played a very special intimate show at Dublin's Olympia Theatre. The show took place at midnight directly after a show by Imelda May.

On 30 January 2011 the first full European leg took place, starting in Cologne, Germany before moving onto France, Belgium, the Netherlands, Denmark, Switzerland, Italy, Spain and Portugal and finally Ireland where they played their first arena shows. The band announced three dates in Dublin, Belfast and Killarney, however, within minutes of these shows going on sale, they sold out and resulted in four more dates being added including two more in Dublin and one each in Belfast and Killarney. Within 45 minutes of the band's original seven Irish shows going on sale they had sold in excess of 60,000 tickets.

The band later announced that they would return to The UK in March 2011, this time playing arenas. Tickets for the eleven date tour sold out, resulting in a second London show being added, this time at the world-famous Wembley Arena. The band returned to Australia in April 2011 to perform their biggest headline shows to date in the country. A short Asian leg took place in April also, taking in Singapore, Hong Kong and Manila. Towards the end of April the band announced they would take part in the VH1 Best Cruise Ever along with Maroon 5, Train and Colbie Caillat. Asia| A second North American leg began in May 2011 at The Warfield in San Francisco. They also visited Canada for the first time on this tour, performing at Toronto's Kool Haus. This leg finished at New York's Rockefeller Center. In June the band played their first festivals of the year at the Isle of Wight Festival and the Pinkpop Festival in the Netherlands. A South African leg took place in June in which the band performed in Cape Town and Johannesburg, with the latter concert attended by 18,000 people.

On 2 July the band performed at Dublin's Aviva Stadium before their largest audience to date, a crowd of approximately 50,000, This show was titled Homecoming. It was later announced that the show will be recorded for DVD release, a release date has not yet been announced. The band took part in numerous festival around Europe in July 2011 playing at the world-famous festival Oxegen in Ireland. They also played T in the Park in Scotland and the V Festival in England. It was announced that the band would perform at the returning Tennents ViTal with Two Door Cinema Club and Ellie Goulding as supporting acts. The final and biggest North American leg began in Minneapolis with a further thirty dates in Canada and the US. A short Asian leg also took place between 12 and 18 November before the band performed at Christmas Balls across the US in December 2011, ending the Science & Faith Tour in Atlanta on 13 December 2011.

== The Script ==
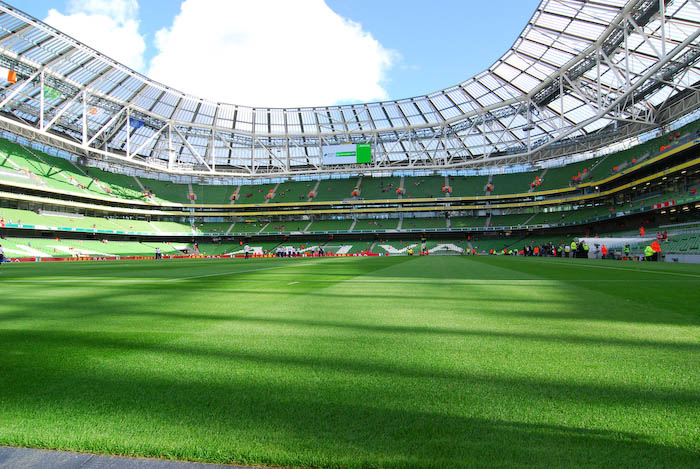
Aviva Stadium, the venue for the band's largest headline show.

- Danny O'Donoghue – Lead vocals/Keyboard
- Mark Sheehan – Guitarist/Backing vocals
- Glen Power – Drums/Backing vocals
- Ben Sargeant-Bass

== Set list ==
Europe (2010/2011), North America (2010)
1. "You Won't Feel A Thing"
2. "Talk You Down"
3. "We Cry"
4. "If You Ever Come Back"
5. "Before The Worst"
6. "If You See Kay"
7. "Science & Faith"
8. "The Man Who Can't Be Moved"
9. "I'm Yours"
10. "Nothing"
11. "Rusty Halo"
12. "For The First Time"
13. "Breakeven"
Arena Shows (Ireland, United Kingdom & Australia)
1. "You Won't Feel A Thing"
2. "Talk You Down"
3. "We Cry"
4. "If You Ever Come Back"
5. "Before The Worst"
6. "If You See Kay"
7. "The End Where I Begin"
8. "Science & Faith"
9. "The Man Who Can't Be Moved"
10. "I'm Yours"
11. "Nothing"
12. "Dead Man Walking"
13. "Rusty Halo"
14. "For The First Time"
15. "This = Love"
16. "Breakeven"
Singapore, Hongkong & Manila
1. "You Won't Feel A Thing"
2. "Talk You Down"
3. "We Cry"
4. "If You Ever Come Back"
5. "Before The Worst"
6. "If You See Kay"
7. "The End Where I Begin"
8. "Science & Faith"
9. "The Man Who Can't Be Moved"
10. "I'm Yours"
11. "Nothing"
12. "Dead Man Walking"
13. "Rusty Halo"
14. "For The First Time"
15. "Breakeven"
Homecoming – Aviva Stadium
1. "You Won't Feel A Thing"
2. "Talk You Down"
3. "We Cry"
4. "If You Ever Come Back"
5. "Before The Worst"
6. "If You See Kay"
7. "The End Where I Begin"
8. "Science & Faith"
9. "The Man Who Can't Be Moved"
10. "I'm Yours"
11. "Nothing"
12. "Written in the Stars ft. Tinie Tempah"
13. "Deadman Walking"
14. "Rusty Halo"
15. "For The First Time"
16. "This = Love"
17. "Breakeven"
18. "Heroes" (David Bowie cover)

== Support acts ==
- Lissie (Leg 1—United Kingdom)
- Michael Paynter (Leg 2—Australia)
- Hugo (Leg 3—North America), (select dates)
- Joshua Radin (Leg 3—North America), (select dates)
- Ryan Sheridan (Leg 6), (Leg 8—Europe), (select dates)
- Clayton Senne (Leg 7—Orlando)
- The Coronas (Leg 8—Europe), (select dates), (Aviva Stadium, Dublin)
- Clare Maguire (Leg 8—Europe), (select dates)
- Tinie Tempah (Leg 9—Australia & Aviva Stadium, Dublin)
- Andrew Allen (Leg 13—North America), (select dates)
- SafetySuit (Leg 13 & 17—North America), (select dates)
- The Arrows (Leg 15—South Africa)
- Loick Essien (Leg 16—Camden Town only)
- Maverick Sabre (Leg 16—Norfolk & Brighton only)
- Two Door Cinema Club (Leg 16—Bangor only)
- Ellie Goulding (Leg 16—Bangor only)
- The Wombats (Leg 16—Bangor only)
- Foster the People (Leg 16—Bangor only)
- Hot Chelle Rae (Leg 17—North America) (select dates)
- Jeremy Messersmith (Leg 17—North America) (select dates)

== Tour dates ==
Date	City	Country	Venue
Leg 1: Europe
11 September 2010	Liverpool	England	University of Liverpool
12 September 2010	Leeds	England	O2 Academy Leeds
13 September 2010	London	England	Hammersmith Apollo
15 September 2010	Edinburgh	Scotland	Edinburgh Corn Exchange
16 September 2010	Leicester	England	De Montfort Hall
17 September 2010	Portsmouth	England	Portsmouth Guildhall
Leg 2: Australia
5 October 2010	Melbourne	Australia	Palace Theatre
6 October 2010	Sydney	Australia	Luna Park Big Top
Leg 3: North America
19 October 2010	San Diego	United States	House of Blues
12 October 2010	Los Angeles	United States	Wiltern Theatre
13 October 2010	San Francisco	United States	The Fillmore
15 October 2010	Portland	United States	Crystal Ballroom
16 October 2010	Seattle	United States	Showbox Sodo
17 October 2010	Phoenix	United States	Arizona State Fair
19 October 2010	Denver	United States	Ogden Theatre
20 October 2010	Dallas	United States	House of Blues
22 October 2010	Minneapolis	United States	State Theatre
23 October 2010	Chicago	United States	Riviera Theatre
24 October 2010	Royal Oak	United States	Royal Oak Music Theatre
26 October 2010	Indianapolis	United States	Egyptian Room
28 October 2010	Atlanta	United States	Variety Playhouse
29 October 2010	Orlando	United States	House of Blues
30 October 2010	St. Petersburg	United States	Jannus Landing
1 November 2010	Norfolk	United States	The NorVa
2 November 2010	Washington, D.C.	United States	9:30 Club
3 November 2010	Philadelphia	United States	Electric Factory
4 November 2010	New York City	United States	Terminal 5
5 November 2010	New York City	United States	Terminal 5
7 November 2010	Boston	United States	House of Blues
Leg 4: Europe
4 December 2010	London	England	The O_{2} Arena^{^{[A]}}
Leg 5: North America
11 December 2010	Sunrise	United States	BankAtlantic Center^{^{[B]}}
13 December 2010	Orlando	United States	House of Blues^{^{[C]}}
Leg 6: Europe
17 December 2010	Dublin	Ireland	Olympia Theatre
Leg 7: North America
15 January 2011	Orlando	United States	House of Blues
Leg 8: Europe
30 January 2011	Cologne	Germany	Live Music Hall
31 January 2011	Paris	France	La Cigale
1 February 2011	Amsterdam	Netherlands	Paradiso
2 February 2011	Brussels	Belgium	Ancienne Belgique
4 February 2011	Copenhagen	Denmark	Vega
5 February 2011	Hamburg	Germany	Große Freiheit
6 February 2011	Berlin	Germany	Kesselhaus
8 February 2011	Munich	Germany	Backstage Werk
9 February 2011	Zürich	Switzerland	Komplex 457
10 February 2011	Milan	Italy	Alcatraz
12 February 2011	Barcelona	Spain	Razzmatazz
13 February 2011	Madrid	Spain	La Riviera
14 February 2011	Lisbon	Portugal	Coliseum
4 March 2011	Killarney	Ireland	INEC
5 March 2011	Killarney	Ireland	INEC
7 March 2011	Belfast	Northern Ireland	Odyssey Arena
8 March 2011	Belfast	Northern Ireland	Odyssey Arena
10 March 2011	Dublin	Ireland	The O_{2}
11 March 2011	Dublin	Ireland	The O_{2}
12 March 2011	Dublin	Ireland	The O_{2}
14 March 2011	Liverpool	England	Echo Arena Liverpool
15 March 2011	Nottingham	England	Capital FM Arena
17 March 2011	Birmingham	England	LG Arena
18 March 2011	Manchester	England	Evening News Arena
19 March 2011	Newcastle	England	Metro Radio Arena
21 March 2011	Glasgow	Scotland	SECC
22 March 2011	Aberdeen	Scotland	AECC
24 March 2011	Bournemouth	England	Bournemouth International Centre
25 March 2011	London	England	Wembley Arena
26 March 2011	London	England	The O_{2} Arena
28 March 2011	Plymouth	England	Plymouth Pavilions
29 March 2011	Cardiff	Wales	Motorpoint Arena Cardiff
Leg 9: Australia
2 April 2011	Perth	Australia	Challenge Stadium
4 April 2011	Adelaide	Australia	AEC Theatre
5 April 2011	Melbourne	Australia	Festival Hall
6 April 2011	Melbourne	Australia	Festival Hall
8 April 2011	Sydney	Australia	Hordern Pavilion
9 April 2011	Sydney	Australia	Hordern Pavilion
10 April 2011	Brisbane	Australia	Brisbane Convention & Exhibition Centre
Leg 10: Asia
12 April 2011	Singapore	Singapore	Fort Canning Park
14 April 2011	Hong Kong	Hong Kong	Star Hall
16 April 2011	Quezon City	Philippines	Araneta Coliseum
Leg 11: North America
28 April 2011	Tampa/Cozumel	United States/Mexico	VH1: Best Cruise Ever
29 April 2011	Tampa/Cozumel	United States/Mexico	VH1: Best Cruise Ever
30 April 2011	Tampa/Cozumel	United States/Mexico	VH1: Best Cruise Ever
1 May 2011	Tampa/Cozumel	United States/Mexico	VH1: Best Cruise Ever
2 May 2011	Tampa/Cozumel	United States/Mexico	VH1: Best Cruise Ever
Leg 12: Europe
15 May 2011	Carlisle	England	Carlisle Airport^{^{[D]}}
Leg 13: North America
26 May 2011	San Francisco	United States	The Warfield
27 May 2011	Los Angeles	United States	Club Nokia
28 May 2011	Las Vegas	United States	House of Blues
31 May 2011	Toronto	Canada	Kool Haus
1 June 2011	Chicago	United States	Aragon Ballroom
3 June 2011	Philadelphia	United States	Mann Center for the Performing Arts
4 June 2011	New York City	United States	Rumsey Playfield
8 June 2011	Boston	United States	Bank of America Pavilion
10 June 2011	New York City	United States	The Plaza at Rockefeller Center^{^{[E]}}
Leg 14: Europe (Festival Appearances)
12 June 2011	Isle of Wight	England	Seaclose Park^{^{[F]}}
13 June 2011	Landgraaf	Netherlands	Megaland Park^{^{[G]}}
Leg 15: Africa
24 June 2011	Johannesburg	South Africa	Coca-Cola Dome
26 June 2011	Cape Town	South Africa	The Grand Arena
Leg 16: Europe (Homecoming & Festival Appearances)
2 July 2011	Dublin	Ireland	Aviva Stadium
8 July 2011	Naas	Ireland	Punchestown Racecourse^{^{[H]}}
9 July 2011	Perth and Kinross	Scotland	Balado^{^{[I]}}
12 July 2011	Camden Town	England	Roundhouse^{^{[J]}}
14 July 2011	Norfolk	England	Thetford Forest
16 July 2011	Bern	Switzerland	The Gurten^{^{[K]}}
17 July 2011	Brighton	England	Brighton Centre
6 August 2011	Alentejo	Portugal	Zambujeira do Mar^{^{[L]}}
13 August 2011	Sønderborg	Denmark	Mølleparken
18 August 2011	Edinburgh	Scotland	Corn Exchange^{^{[AA]}}
20 August 2011	Staffordshire	England	Weston Park^{^{M]}}
21 August 2011	Chelmsford	England	Hylands Park^{^{[N]}}
23 August 2011	Bangor	Northern Ireland	Ward Park^{^{[O]}}
Leg 17: North America
30 August 2011	Minneapolis	United States	Orpheum Theatre
1 September 2011	Washington, D.C.	United States	DAR Constitution Hall
3 September 2011	Syracuse	United States	Great New York State Fair
4 September 2011	Pittsburgh	United States	Stage AE
6 September 2011	Columbus	United States	LC Pavilion
7 September 2011	Detroit	United States	The Fillmore Detroit
9 September 2011	Nashville	United States	Ryman Auditorium
10 September 2011	Cincinnati	United States	PNC Pavilion
11 September 2011	Indianapolis	United States	Murat Theatre
13 September 2011	Louisville	United States	The Louisville Palace
14 September 2011	St. Louis	United States	The Pageant
16 September 2011	Park City	United States	Hartman Arena
17 September 2011	Kenosha	United States	Table Athletics Center
18 September 2011	Denver	United States	Ogden Theater
20 September 2011	Portland	United States	Crystal Ballroom
21 September 2011	Seattle	United States	Paramount Theatre
23 September 2011	Oakland	United States	Fox Oakland Theatre
24 September 2011	Los Angeles	United States	Hollywood Palladium
25 September 2011	Tempe	United States	Marquee Theatre
27 September 2011	Norman	United States	Riverwind Casino
28 September 2011	Tulsa	United States	Cain's Ballroom
30 September 2011	Austin	United States	Stubbs Waller Creek Amphitheatre
1 October 2011	Houston	United States	House of Blues
2 October 2011	Dallas	United States	Palladium
4 October 2011	New Orleans	United States	Mahalia Jackson Theatre
5 October 2011	Clearwater	United States	Ruth Eckerd Hall
7 October 2011	Miami Beach	United States	The Fillmore
8 October 2011	Orlando	United States	Hard Rock Live, Orlando
9 October 2011	Atlanta	United States	The Tabernacle
11 October 2011	Charlotte	United States	The Fillmore
13 October 2011	New York City	United States	Roseland Ballroom
14 October 2011	Huntington	United States	Paramount Theatre
15 October 2011	Mashantucket	United States	Foxwoods Resort Casino
Leg 18: Asia
12 November 2011	Jakarta	Indonesia	Ballroom Central Park^{^{[AB]}}
16 November 2011	Muscat	Oman	InterContinental Gardens
18 November 2011	Dubai	United Arab Emirates	Sundance Beach
Leg 19: North America
10 December 2011	Sunrise	United States	BankAtlantic Center^{^{[AC]}}
11 December 2011	Tampa	United States	St. Pete Times Forum^{^{[AD]}}
13 December 2011	Duluth	United States	Arena at Gwinnett Center^{^{[AE]}}

Festivals and other miscellaneous performances

- A This show was part of the Jingle Bell Ball.
- B This show was part of the Y100 Jingle Ball.
- C This show was part of the WXXL XL'ent Xmas.
- D This show is part of the Radio 1's Big Weekend.
- E This show is part of the Toyota Summer Series.
- F This show is part of the Isle of Wight Festival.
- G This show is part of the Pinkpop Festival.
- H This show is part of the Oxegen Festival.
- I This show is part of the T in the Park Festival.
- J This show is part of the iTunes Festival.
- K This show is part of the Gurtenfestival.
- L This show is part of the Sudoeste Festival.
- M This show is part of the V Festival.
- N This show is part of the V Festival.
- O This show is part of Tennents ViTal.
- AA This show is part of The Edge Festival.
- AB This show is part of Arthur's Day Indonesia.
- AC This show is part of the Y-100 Jingle Ball.
- AD This show is part of the WFLZ-FM Jingle Ball.
- AE This show is part of the WSTR (FM) Jingle Ball.

Cancellations and rescheduled shows

5 June 2011	Washington, D.C.	DAR Constitution Hall	Postponed due to illness, rescheduled to 30 August 2011
7 June 2011	Minneapolis	Orphuem Theatre	Postponed due to illness, rescheduled to 1 September 2011

=== Box office score data ===
Venue	City	No. of Shows	Tickets sold / available	Gross revenue
INEC	Killarney	2	6,966 / 6,966 (100%)	$290,196
Odyssey Arena	Belfast	2	20,621 / 20,621 (100%)	$838,424
The O_{2}	Dublin	3	37,572 / 37,572 (100%)	$1,566,450
Evening News Arena	Manchester	1	16,024 / 16,024 (100%)	$645,475
The O_{2} Arena	London	1	17,078 / 17,502 (98%)	$729,226
Challenge Stadium	Perth	1	4,614 / 5,109 (90%)	$262,621
AEC Theatre	Adelaide	1	2,326 / 2,326 (100%)	$132,825
Festival Hall	Melbourne	2	8,902 / 10,032 (89%)	$507,926
Hordern Pavilion	Sydney	2	10,806 / 10,806 (100%)	$683,636
Convention & Exhibition Centre	Brisbane	1	4,578 / 4,578 (100%)	$265,797
Aragon Ballroom	Chicago	1	3,322 / 4,873 (68%)	$99,854
Aviva Stadium	Dublin	1	47,910 / 47,910 (100%)	$3,179,010
Stage AE	Pittsburgh	1	1,328 / 1,600 (83%)	$43,398
Ryman Auditorium	Nashville	1	2,013 / 2,162 (93%)	$71,479
Orpheum Theatre	Minneapolis	1	2,425 / 2,425 (100%)	$75,175
Fox Theatre	Oakland	1	2,257 / 2,800 (81%)	$73,487
Stubbs Waller Creek Amphitheatre	Austin	1	2,046 / 2,200 (93%)	$61,035
Ruth Eckerd Hall	Clearwater	1	1,673 / 1,956 (86%)	$60,127
LC Pavilion	Columbus	1	1,067 / 2,200 (49%)	$30,044
Total		25 / 139	193,528 / 199,661 (97%)	$9,616,367

== Live recording ==
It was announced that the band recorded their entire Homecoming show at the Aviva Stadium in their hometown of Dublin, Ireland on 2 July. This was released on DVD on 5 December 2011.
