= Glen Power =

Irish musician, songwriter, actor, and film composer

Glen Joseph Power is an Irish musician, songwriter, actor, and film composer, best known as the drummer and founding member of the pop rock band The Script. He returned to The Script for their 2026 UK and Europe tour.

Outside The Script, Power has worked as a songwriter, collaborating with Journey frontman Steve Perry on Power's composition "The Streets of Kinsale" (2023) for The High Kings. Power has also worked as a film composer, scoring and appearing in the short film Disposition (2016).

== The Script ==
Danny O'Donoghue and Mark Sheehan, childhood friends who had worked as songwriters in Los Angeles, recruited Power in 2005.

The Script signed with Phonogenic (Sony Music) in 2005 and released their self-titled debut album in August 2008. The band has released seven studio albums and a greatest hits compilation.

On 14 April 2023, Mark Sheehan died at age 46 following a brief illness. Reflecting on first meeting Sheehan, Power stated: "We clicked instantly... One night hanging out together, he said to me 'I am taking you to the top' and looking back now, 10 years later, I can honestly say that Mark was indeed a man of his word". The band contemplated disbanding, with Power describing Sheehan as "the bridge that brought us all together".

In May 2024, Power and O'Donoghue announced The Script's expansion to a four-piece, welcoming longtime touring members Ben Sargeant (bass) and Ben Weaver (guitar). The band released Satellites in August 2024.

== Songwriting and collaborations outside The Script ==
=== The High Kings and Steve Perry collaboration ===
During the COVID-19 lockdown period, Power began writing songs for Irish traditional folk group The High Kings. What started as a collaboration request from the band's manager evolved into a larger project, with Power writing several songs for the group. Power co-wrote "Chasing Rainbows" with The Script bandmate Danny O'Donoghue for The High Kings' eighth studio album, released as a single on 24 February 2023.

One composition, "The Streets of Kinsale", based on the legend of the White Lady of Kinsale (Wilful Warrender), resulted in a collaboration with Journey vocalist Steve Perry. Power explained the song's genesis: "I was sitting in the bathtub in London. There was a party at the back of my house and I heard a melody, which I changed a bit and thought, 'Oh, I know what that is. It's the song I've been thinking about'. So I jumped up, went downstairs with my towel, pulled my guitar out, put the capo on the second fret and the chorus arrived."

The song deals with the legend of a wedding, in Kinsale, County Cork, that resulted in the funerals of the bride, groom, and bride's father all on the same day, with the bride's spirit still haunting the town. Power had maintained contact with Perry after the Journey frontman had previously expressed interest in collaborating. When The Script were performing in Los Angeles, Power sent Perry the demo. Five days later, Perry called asking if he could sing on the track.

"The Streets of Kinsale" was released on 28 April 2023, featuring Perry on vocals and harmonies alongside The High Kings, with Power credited as writer and producer. Steve Perry has described himself as a Script fan, having attended several of their Las Vegas performances.

=== Collaboration with son Luke Power ===
Power has collaborated musically with his son Luke, who performs as BadScandal in the electronic/house music genre.

The pair released "Tomorrow" and "The Shore" in 2022. The latter track was originally written by Glen Power for The High Kings; when it didn't suit them, BadScandal reworked it into a house track.

The pair also co-wrote and recorded "Bitter Wine", with Glen Power providing the high-register chorus vocals.

== Personal life ==
Power is a Reiki practitioner and practices mindfulness and meditation. He appeared on Dermot Whelan's "The Mind Full Podcast" in 2024, discussing coping with Sheehan's death, alcohol-free living and his "un-peopling" technique for dealing with overwhelm.

== Discography ==
=== With The Script ===
- The Script (2008)
- Science & Faith (2010)
- #3 (2012)
- No Sound Without Silence (2014)
- Freedom Child (2017)
- Sunsets & Full Moons (2019)
- Tales from The Script: Greatest Hits (2021)
- Satellites (2024)

=== As songwriter/producer for other artists ===
- The High Kings – "Chasing Rainbows" (2023) – Co-writer with Danny O'Donoghue
- The High Kings – "The Streets of Kinsale" featuring Steve Perry (2023) – Writer and producer

=== Film scores ===
- Disposition (2016) – Complete soundtrack and actor
- The Box (2017) – Composer

=== Collaborations ===
- "Tomorrow" – Harddope, BadScandal, and Glen Power (2022)
- "The Shore" – Glen Power & BadScandal (2022) – Soave Records
- "Bitter Wine" – BadScandal featuring Glen Power (vocals)
