= If You Ever Come Back =

2011 single by the Script

Single by the Script

from the album Science & Faith
- Released: 4 April 2011
- Recorded: 2010
- Genre: Pop
- Length: 4:02
- Label: Epic; Phonogenic
- Songwriter(s): Danny O'Donoghue; Mark Sheehan; Steve Kipner; Andrew Frampton
- Producer(s): Mark Sheehan; Danny O'Donoghue; Andrew Frampton; Steve Kipner

The Script singles chronology
"Nothing" (2010)	"If You Ever Come Back" (2011)	"Science & Faith" (2011)

"If You Ever Come Back" is a song by Irish pop rock band the Script from their second studio album, Science & Faith. The song was released as the third single on 4 April 2011. It was written and produced by Danny O'Donoghue, Mark Sheehan, Steve Kipner, and Andrew Frampton.

== Track listing ==
No.	Title	Length
1.	"If You Ever Come Back"	4:02

== Personnel ==
- Songwriting – Danny O'Donoghue, Mark Sheehan, Steve Kipner, Andrew Frampton
- Production – Mark Sheehan, Danny O'Donoghue, Andrew Frampton, Steve Kipner
- Drums, guitars, keyboards and vocals – The Script
- Guitars, keyboards and programming – Andrew Frampton
- Bass – Ben Sargeant

== Charts ==
Chart (2011–2012)	Peak position
Australia (ARIA)	47
Netherlands (Dutch Top 40)	29
New Zealand (Recorded Music NZ)	29
UK Singles (OCC)	115
US Adult Pop Airplay (Billboard)	19

== Certifications ==
Region	Certification	Certified units/sales
Australia (ARIA)	Gold	35,000^{^}
New Zealand (RMNZ)	Gold	7,500^{*}
^{*} Sales figures based on certification alone.^{^} Shipments figures based on certification alone.
