= Science & Faith (song) =

Single by the Script

from the album Science & Faith
- Released: 27 May 2011
- Recorded: 2010
- Genre: Pop rock
- Length: 4:20
- Label: Epic; Phonogenic
- Songwriter(s): Danny O'Donoghue; Mark Sheehan
- Producer(s): Mark Sheehan; Danny O'Donoghue; Andrew Frampton

The Script singles chronology
"If You Ever Come Back" (2011)	"Science & Faith" (2011)	"Hall of Fame" (2012)

"Science & Faith" is a song by Irish pop rock band the Script, from their second studio album, of the same name. The song was released as the fourth and final single on 30 May 2011. It was written and produced by Danny O'Donoghue and Mark Sheehan. A music video to accompany the release of "Science & Faith" was first released onto YouTube on 6 June 2011 at a total length of three minutes and fifty seconds.

== Track listing ==
Digital download
No.	Title	Length
1.	"Science & Faith"	4:20
2.	"Science & Faith" (Live From the Birmingham NEC)	6:48

== Chart performance ==
Chart (2011)	Peak position
Belgium (Ultratip Bubbling Under Flanders)	23

== Release history ==
Region	Date	Format
United Kingdom	27 May 2011	Digital download
