= Hall of Fame (song) =

2012 single by the Script

Single by the Script featuring will.i.am

from the album #3
- Released: 20 August 2012
- Recorded: 2012
- Genre: Rap rock; pop rock
- Length: 3:22
- Label: Epic; Phonogenic
- Songwriters: Danny O'Donoghue; Mark Sheehan; James Barry
- Producers: Danny O'Donoghue; Mark Sheehan; Jimbo Barry

The Script singles chronology
"Science & Faith" (2011)	"Hall of Fame" (2012)	"Six Degrees of Separation" (2012)

will.i.am singles chronology
"This Is Love" (2012)	"Hall of Fame" (2012)	"In My City" (2012)

Audio sample
- "Hall of Fame": file; help

"Hall of Fame" is a song by Irish pop rock band the Script featuring American rapper will.i.am of the Black Eyed Peas. It is the lead single from the band's third studio album #3. The track was given its first radio play on Capital on 23 July 2012. Written and co-produced by the band, the song is about following dreams and making an impact on the world. The song has been licensed for use in various media since its release.

== Background ==
The Script frontman Danny O'Donoghue first met will.i.am while they were both judges for The Voice UK. O'Donoghue said: "We went to the recording studio and an hour and a half later we had the song in its entirety. I thought he was going to produce it but he just gave it to me and Mark (Sheehan) and said 'you guys go and produce it'." Of the collaboration O'Donoghue said: "We were trying to play it super cool - us with will.i.am! We heard him singing some of our lines, but we still didn't know what he was going to do. We were worried he might take some of our original song out. But he just sang our words." The musical note structure interpolates "I Hope You Dance" by country singer Lee Ann Womack. According to Musicnotes, "Hall of Fame" is written in the key of G minor with a tempo of 88 beats per minute.

== Lyrics and interpretation ==
The lyrics, written by O'Donoghue, focus on perseverance and making a difference. As reported in The Guardian, "O'Donoghue's real metier is lyrics: he's a striking and emotional storyteller". Billboard describes the song as "a swelling, piano-driven number with an uplifting, earworm of a chorus that soars, 'Standing in the hall of fame / And the world's gonna know your name / Cause you burn with the brightest flame.'" O'Donoghue explains that this song was about the band as he tells "the title is mostly about us. As any geek fan of the band could tell you, we're all extremely different people, but magic happens when you mix us together. Well, magic or a car crash, which is how we describe the songs we scrap." He also said: "We wanted to inspire people to stop trying to be famous for the sake of it."

== Music video ==
The music video of "Hall of Fame" was produced under Sony Music Entertainment UK Limited. A lyric video for the track was released on 24 July 2012. The music video was released on 19 August through the band's official site, and was released later on the day after the song's release on YouTube. The accompanying music video sees the stars performing the track in a deserted warehouse, while other scenes feature an aspiring boxer and hearing-impaired ballet dancer in training.

== Chart performance ==
"Hall of Fame" debuted on the Irish Singles Chart at number one. The song stayed at number 1 in Ireland for 4 weeks. This marks the band's second number-one single and fifth top-ten hit in Ireland. This song was voted as one of the top 11 Irish songs.

The single debuted at number two on the UK Singles Chart, losing the top spot to Ne-Yo's "Let Me Love You (Until You Learn to Love Yourself)", before reaching number 1 a week later, marking the Script's first UK number-one single. It spent a second week at number one in the UK, blocking Example's "Say Nothing" from reaching the top spot. It has sold 529,000 copies in 2012, the 21st best-selling single of the year in the UK. It also peaked at number 25 in the United States and was certified platinum there, and peaked at the same position in Canada. It reached 2 million in sales in the US by July 2013, and as of April 2016, the song has sold 2,912,000 copies in the US.

In Australia, "Hall of Fame" peaked at number 4 on the ARIA Singles Chart, becoming their second top five hit there. The song was certified 3× Platinum in Australia. It became their highest-charting single in New Zealand, peaking at number 3 on RIANZ chart. It is the band's highest-charting song worldwide.

== Usage in media ==
"Hall of Fame" was used to advertise the return of serial dramas All My Children and One Life to Live. The song was covered on the Glee episode "All or Nothing". Masterchef Australia: The Professionals used it as the theme song in the opening credits. The song was also published in the ads section for NBC's primetime drama, Chicago Fire. The song has also been used as the theme song for Impact Wrestling and WWE's Hall of Fame ceremonies. It has also been used at recent Arena Football League and National Football League Hall of Fame Games. The song was used in a 2014 Omega SA commercial featuring professional golfer Rory McIlroy. In 2016, this song is used as the theme song on the Disney Princess series shorts "Dream Big, Princess" which airs on Disney Junior. The song was chosen as the theme song for "Life Without Limits" a short film about Cincinnati hosting the 37th Annual National Veterans Wheelchair Games. In 2018, the German YouTube creator Rezo created an ensemble cast of 100 YouTuber colleagues with this song. The song makes a brief appearance in the 2021 animated Netflix film: My Little Pony: A New Generation and it was also used in the 2023 racing video game franchise Gran Turismo in the opening credits showing flashbacks from the previous video games. In 2023, American television station CBS, and its sports division CBS Sports, included the song in a six-minute long video tribute to the SEC on CBS that they posted on social media, as the network's contract with the conference expired following the 2023 SEC Championship Game. The tribute video, which also included "High Hopes" by Panic! at the Disco and "A Sky Full of Stars" by Coldplay, later aired during CBS's pregame show. In 2025, legendary boxer Manny Pacquiao used the song as his entrance music for his comeback bout against Mario Barrios.

== Track listing ==
- CD single / Digital download
1. "Hall of Fame" - 3:22
2. "Hall of Fame" (Jimbo Remix) - 3:02

== Charts ==
=== Weekly charts ===
Weekly chart performance
Chart (2012–2013)	Peak position
Australia (ARIA)	4
Austria (Ö3 Austria Top 40)	1
Belgium (Ultratop 50 Flanders)	8
Belgium (Ultratop 50 Wallonia)	12
Canada Hot 100 (Billboard)	25
Canada CHR/Top 40 (Billboard)	46
Canada Hot AC (Billboard)	24
Czech Republic Airplay (ČNS IFPI)	5
Denmark (Tracklisten)	11
Europe (Euro Digital Songs)	1
Finland (Suomen virallinen lista)	2
Finland Airplay (Radiosoittolista)	35
France (SNEP)	60
Germany (GfK)	2
Hungary (Rádiós Top 40)	5
Ireland (IRMA)	1
Irish Airplay (Nielsen Soundscan)	1
Israel International Airplay (Media Forest)	5
Italy (FIMI)	5
Japan (Japan Hot 100)	97
Luxembourg Digital Songs (Billboard)	2
Netherlands (Dutch Top 40)	17
Netherlands (Single Top 100)	16
New Zealand (Recorded Music NZ)	3
Norway (VG-lista)	3
Portugal (Billboard)	6
Russia Airplay (TopHit)	2
Scottish Singles Sales (Official Charts)	1
Slovakia Airplay (ČNS IFPI)	4
Slovenia (SloTop50)	32
South Korea (Gaon International Chart)	12
Spain (Promusicae)	11
Sweden (Sverigetopplistan)	3
Switzerland (Schweizer Hitparade)	3
UK Radio Airplay (Nielsen Soundscan)	1
UK Singles (Official Charts)	1
UK Streaming (Official Charts)	1
UK TV Airplay (Nielsen Soundscan)	6
Ukraine Airplay (TopHit)	12
US Billboard Hot 100	25
US Pop Airplay (Billboard)	17
US Adult Pop Airplay (Billboard)	13
US Rock Songs (Billboard)	15

=== Year-end charts ===
2012 year-end chart performance
Chart (2012)	Position
Australia (ARIA)	20
Belgium (Ultratop Flanders)	76
Hungary (Rádiós Top 40)	33
Italy (FIMI)	43
Netherlands (Dutch Top 40)	55
Netherlands (Single Top 100)	69
Russia Airplay (TopHit)	53
Sweden (Sverigetopplistan)	29
UK Singles (Official Charts Company)	21

2013 year-end chart performance
Chart (2013)	Position
Austria (Ö3 Austria Top 40)	19
Germany (Media Control AG)	14
Russia Airplay (TopHit)	36
Spain (PROMUSICAE)	48
Sweden (Sverigetopplistan)	36
Switzerland (Schweizer Hitparade)	15
Ukraine Airplay (TopHit)	36
UK Singles (Official Charts Company)	105
US Billboard Hot 100	85

=== Decade-end charts ===
Decennium chart rankings
Chart (2010–2019)	Position
Australia (ARIA)	44

=== All-time charts ===
All-time chart rankings
Chart	Position
UK Download Chart	89

== Certifications ==
Certifications and sales
Region	Certification	Certified units/sales
Australia (ARIA)	10× Platinum	700,000^{‡}
Austria (IFPI Austria)	Gold	15,000^{*}
Belgium (BRMA)	Gold	15,000^{*}
Brazil (Pro-Música Brasil)	3× Platinum	180,000^{‡}
Denmark (IFPI Danmark)	Gold	15,000^{^}
Finland (Musiikkituottajat)	Gold	5,524
Germany (BVMI)	2× Platinum	1,200,000^{‡}
Italy (FIMI)	3× Platinum	150,000^{‡}
Netherlands (NVPI)	Gold	10,000^{^}
New Zealand (RMNZ)	6× Platinum	180,000^{‡}
Norway (IFPI Norway)	6× Platinum	60,000^{*}
Spain (Promusicae)	2× Platinum	120,000^{‡}
Sweden (GLF)	4× Platinum	160,000^{‡}
Switzerland (IFPI Switzerland)	2× Platinum	60,000^{^}
United Kingdom (BPI)	4× Platinum	2,400,000^{‡}
United States (RIAA)	2× Platinum	2,000,000
Streaming
Denmark (IFPI Danmark)	4× Platinum	7,200,000^{†}
^{*} Sales figures based on certification alone.^{^} Shipments figures based on certification alone.^{‡} Sales+streaming figures based on certification alone.^{†} Streaming-only figures based on certification alone.

== Release history ==
Release dates and formats for "Hall of Fame"
Region	Date	Format	Label(s)	Ref.
United States	11 September 2012	Mainstream airplay	Epic	
