= The Last Time (The Script song) =

Single by The Script

from the album Sunsets & Full Moons
- Released: 20 September 2019
- Genre: Stadium rock; pop rock; pop
- Length: 3:16
- Label: Sony Music UK; Columbia
- Songwriters: Danny O'Donoghue; James Abrahart; James Barry; Mark Sheehan
- Producers: Danny O'Donoghue; Jimbo Barry; Mark Sheehan; Samuel Tsang

The Script singles chronology
"Arms Open" (2017)	"The Last Time" (2019)	"Run Through Walls" (2020)

Music video
- "The Last Time" on YouTube

"The Last Time" is a song by Irish rock band The Script, released through Sony Music UK as the lead single from their sixth studio album, Sunsets & Full Moons, on 20 September 2019.

== Background ==
Frontman Danny O'Donoghue said the song was written "about the intense feelings you experience when you realise you may be seeing the one you love [...] for the last time".

== Critical reception ==
Mike Wass of Idolator wrote that the track is a "throwback to the anthemic stadium-rock of Science & Faith and No Sound Without Silence" as well as a "bruised and battered breakup song" and "relatable and instantly catchy". Beth Casteel of Substream Magazine described it as a "poignant little number".

== Music video ==
The music video was released the same day as the song and directed by Charles Mehling. It was filmed in London and stars Polish model Anna Jagodzińska.

== Charts ==
=== Weekly charts ===
Chart (2019–2020)	Peak position
Australia Digital Tracks (ARIA)	14
Belgium (Ultratip Bubbling Under Flanders)	1
Czech Republic (Rádio – Top 100)	10
Hungary (Single Top 40)	12
Ireland (IRMA)	29
Netherlands (Dutch Top 40)	13
Netherlands (Single Top 100)	53
New Zealand Hot Singles (RMNZ)	18
Scotland Singles (OCC)	1
Switzerland (Schweizer Hitparade)	95
UK Singles (OCC)	32

=== Year-end charts ===
Chart (2019)	Position
Netherlands (Dutch Top 40)	65

== Certifications ==
Region	Certification	Certified units/sales
United Kingdom (BPI)	Gold	400,000^{‡}
^{‡} Sales+streaming figures based on certification alone.
