= Six Degrees of Separation (song) =

2012 single by the Script

Single by the Script

from the album #3
- Released: 25 November 2012
- Recorded: 2011–2012
- Genre: Pop rock; alternative rock
- Length: 3:52
- Label: Phonogenic
- Songwriters: Danny O'Donoghue; Mark Sheehan; Steve Kipner; Andrew Frampton
- Producers: Steve Kipner; Andrew Frampton

The Script singles chronology
"Hall of Fame" (2012)	"Six Degrees of Separation" (2012)	"If You Could See Me Now" (2013)

"Six Degrees of Separation" is a song by Irish pop rock band the Script, taken from their third studio album, #3 (2012). The song was released as the album's second single on 25 November 2012. The track was written by Danny O'Donoghue, Mark Sheehan, Steve Kipner and Andrew Frampton. The music video for "Six Degrees of Separation" was uploaded to YouTube on 5 November 2012 at a total length of three minutes and fifty-seven seconds. The band performed the song live during Children in Need on 16 November 2012. The band also performed the track live on The Voice of Holland on 7 December 2012, as well as performing "Hall of Fame" with the remaining contestants.

== Track listing ==
- Digital download
1. "Six Degrees of Separation" – 3:52

== Charts ==
=== Weekly charts ===
Weekly chart performance for "Six Degrees of Separation"
Chart (2012–13)	Peak position
Australia (ARIA)	31
Belgium (Ultratip Bubbling Under Flanders)	4
Hungary (Rádiós Top 40)	32
Ireland (IRMA)	25
Netherlands (Dutch Top 40)	32
Netherlands (Single Top 100)	35
Slovakia Airplay (ČNS IFPI)	33
UK Singles (OCC)	32

=== Year-end charts ===
2013 year-end chart performance for "Six Degrees of Separation"
Chart (2013)	Position
Netherlands (Dutch Top 40)	168

=== Certifications ===
Certifications and sales for "Six Degrees of Separation"
Region	Certification	Certified units/sales
Australia (ARIA)	Platinum	70,000^{‡}
United Kingdom (BPI)	Silver	200,000^{‡}
^{‡} Sales+streaming figures based on certification alone.

== Release history ==
Release dates for "Six Degrees of Separation"
Region	Date	Format	Label
United Kingdom	25 November 2012	Digital download	Phonogenic
