= Isle of Wight Festival 2011 =

Music festival in Newport, UK

- The current Isle of Wight Festival logo
- Genre: Rock, alternative rock
- Dates: 9–12 June 2011
- Locations: Seaclose Park, Isle of Wight, UK
- Website: www.isleofwightfestival.com

The Isle of Wight Festival 2011 was the tenth revived Isle of Wight Festival held at Seaclose Park in Newport on the Isle of Wight. The event ran from 9–12 June 2011. Tickets went on sale on 19 November 2010, and sold out quickly.

The 2011 event was the first under a ten-year deal between the Isle of Wight Council and the promoters Solos.

== Line up ==
=== Main Stage ===
Friday

- Kings of Leon
- Kaiser Chiefs
- The Courteeners
- Band of Horses
- We Are Scientists
- Big Country

Saturday

- Foo Fighters
- Pulp
- Iggy and The Stooges
- Seasick Steve
- Mike + The Mechanics
- Hurts
- Stornoway
- Lissie
- The Vecks

Sunday

- Kasabian
- Beady Eye
- The Script
- Plan B
- Pixie Lott
- Two Door Cinema Club
- James Walsh
- Stu Collins
- Jeff Beck

=== Big Top ===
Thursday

- Boy George
- ABC

Friday

- Joan Jett and The Blackhearts
- Alexandra Burke
- Eliza Doolittle
- Imelda May
- Sharon Corr
- Wonderland
- Edei
- Laura Steel

Saturday

- The British Pink Floyd Show
- Tom Jones
- Chase & Status
- Maverick Sabre
- Parade
- The Cult
- Wild Beasts
- The Vaccines
- Semi Precious Weapons
- Our Fold

Sunday

- Manic Street Preachers
- Public Image Limited
- Cast
- Hadouken!
- Nick Lowe
- Brother
- Various Cruelties
- Springbok Nude Girls
- Twenty Twenty
