= Mytown =

Irish boy band

- Origin: Ireland
- Genre: Pop
- Years active: 1996–2001
- Label: Universal (former)
- Spinoffs: The Script
- Past members: Danny O'Donoghue; Mark Sheehan (deceased); Terry Daly; Dermot Browne; Paul Walker; Tony Dunne

Mytown were an Irish boy band formed in 1996 by Tony Dunne and Paul Walker. Mark Sheehan, Terry Daly and John Duffy were also members when the band first began. They released one album, the eponymous Mytown and had a number of singles before splitting up in 2001, however Browne left before then after a falling-out with Louis Walsh citing irreconcilable differences. Two of the prominent members of the band, namely Danny O'Donoghue and Mark Sheehan, went on to form the pop rock band The Script.

On 14 April 2023, Sheehan died at the age of 46 following a brief illness.

== Discography ==
=== Albums ===
Album with selected details
Title	Album details
Mytown	Release date: 23 May 2000; Label: Universal Music Group

=== Singles ===
- "Do It Like This" (1997) – Ireland only release
- "Party All Night" (1999) – UK #22
- "Body Bumpin'" (1999)
- "Now That I Found You" (2000)
- "Party All Night" (2000) – re-release
