= Rain (The Script song) =

Single by The Script

from the album Freedom Child
- Released: 14 July 2017
- Recorded: December 2016–January 2017
- Genre: Dance; pop
- Length: 3:29
- Label: Sony
- Songwriters: Mark Sheehan; James Barry; Camille Purcell; Daniel O'Donoghue
- Producers: Andrew Frampton; Jimbo; Max Farrar; Mark Sheehan; Daniel O'Donoghue

The Script singles chronology
"Man on a Wire" (2015)	"Rain" (2017)	"Arms Open" (2017)

Music video
- "Rain" on YouTube

"Rain" is a song by Irish rock band The Script. It was written by James Barry, Camille Purcell, Mark Sheehan and Danny O'Donoghue, with the latter two and Andrew Frampton, Jimbo Wallace, Max Farrar handling the song's production. The song was released on 14 July 2017, through Sony Music, as the lead single from the band's fifth studio album Freedom Child.

== Background ==
The Script described the track as a "feel-good summer tune". "After a very long process of making 'Album 5', the song 'Rain' came right at the end. It's a summer song so we thought, only The Script can make it 'Rain in Summer'" the band stated. In an interview with Metro, the band regarded the single as a progression. "I think we have afforded ourselves a little bit of leeway. The past four records have been not the same sound but we've been progressing at a slow rate. It's been two years since we had something out so there's two years worth of progression in our music. I'm sure to a lot of people it might sound quite drastic at first but if they heard the 60 songs we've put out you'd hear a slower progression." When asked if their change in sound was deliberate, they said:

"When we started this record we wanted to do something where people would hear a song and go 'oh I love that song!' and then look it up and find it's us. We wanted to change our sound a push our sound a bit. It's either adapt, change or die in this industry. It's very difficult in this industry. We wanted to revamp and reboot the sound and at the end of the day we're still the same songwriters and that's never going to go away."

The band said that they always "want something different in our lives" and "hoping our songs penetrate different markets and gain new fans", They referred themselves as an ambitious band. "With Rain we just decided we needed something a bit lighter, you can't just walk into a party of people and start with a heavy topic. It's nice to have a bit of escapism that people can bob their head to and not be so serious about but when people peel the layers of the song they realise that lyrically we've gone deep but on the surface we wanted people to have a bit of fun."

== Credits and personnel ==
Credits adapted from Tidal.

- Mark Sheehan – composing, lyrics, producing
- James "Jimbo" Barry – composing, lyrics, producing, bass guitar, drums, guitar, programming
- Camille Purcell – composing, lyrics, background vocals
- Danny O'Donoghue – composing, lyrics, producing
- Andrew Frampton – producing, keyboard, programming, vocal producing
- Max Farrar – producing, keyboard, programming
- Manny Marroquin – mixing engineering
- Emerson Mancini – mastering engineering
- Filippo Barbieri – engineering
- Chris Galland – engineering
- Robin Florent – assistant engineering
- Scott Desmarais – assistant engineering

== Charts ==
=== Weekly charts ===
Chart (2017)	Peak position
Austria (Ö3 Austria Top 40)	63
Belgium (Ultratop 50 Flanders)	27
Belgium (Ultratip Bubbling Under Wallonia)	10
Croatia International Airplay (Top lista)	12
Czech Republic Airplay (ČNS IFPI)	57
Denmark Airplay (Tracklisten)	13
Hungary (Rádiós Top 40)	20
Ireland (IRMA)	13
Mexico Airplay (Billboard)	17
Netherlands (Dutch Top 40)	3
Netherlands (Mega Top 50)	23
Netherlands (Single Top 100)	15
Poland Airplay (ZPAV)	60
Scottish Singles Sales (Official Charts)	4
Slovakia Airplay (ČNS IFPI)	23
Slovenia (SloTop50)	15
Sweden Heatseeker (Sverigetopplistan)	10
Switzerland (Schweizer Hitparade)	87
UK Singles (Official Charts)	15
US Adult Pop Airplay (Billboard)	24

=== Year-end charts ===
Annual chart rankings
Chart (2017)	Position
Latvia Airplay (LaIPA)	96
Netherlands (Dutch Top 40)	12

Chart (2018)	Position
Netherlands Airplay (Airplay Top 40)	80

== Certifications ==
Region	Certification	Certified units/sales
Netherlands (NVPI)	Platinum	40,000^{‡}
United Kingdom (BPI)	Platinum	600,000^{‡}
^{‡} Sales+streaming figures based on certification alone.
