= Nothing (The Script song) =

2010 single by the Script

Single by the Script

from the album Science & Faith
- Released: 19 November 2010
- Recorded: 2010
- Genre: Pop rock
- Length: 4:31
- Label: Epic; Phonogenic
- Songwriters: Danny O'Donoghue; Mark Sheehan; Steve Kipner; Andrew Frampton
- Producers: Mark Sheehan; Danny O'Donoghue; Andrew Frampton; Steve Kipner

The Script singles chronology
"For the First Time" (2010)	"Nothing" (2010)	"If You Ever Come Back" (2011)

"Nothing" is a song by Irish pop rock band the Script from their second studio album, Science & Faith. The song was released as the second single on 19 November 2010. It was written and produced by Danny O'Donoghue, Mark Sheehan, Steve Kipner, and Andrew Frampton. The song charted at number 15 in Ireland, and at number 42 in the United Kingdom. In the United States, the song debuted at number 89 on the Billboard Hot 100, peaking at number 32 on 29 October 2011.

== Background ==
The song is told from the first-person point of view of a man who drinks himself to a stupor after he and his girlfriend break up. Unable to accept that everything is over, he calls her and tells her his feelings, but the girl does not make any response, hence the title "Nothing". The band performed the song during the Children in Need telethon of 2010, and as part of the 2010 Christmas special "Ruth Jones' Christmas Cracker".

== Music video ==
The music video was directed by Charles Mehling. It shows Danny and his bandmates having a drink at their local bar. Danny gets drunk and goes out of the bar, singing about how he's still in love with her. He then jumps into Camden Lock and starts hallucinating that the girl he loves is swimming with him. He almost drowns, but gets rescued by police, where the music video ends.

== Track listing ==
- Digital download
1. "Nothing" – 4:31
2. "Nothing" (Music Video) – 4:33

== Personnel ==
- Songwriting – Danny O'Donoghue, Mark Sheehan, Steve Kipner, Andrew Frampton
- Production – Mark Sheehan, Danny O'Donoghue, Andrew Frampton, Steve Kipner
- Drums, guitars, keyboards and vocals – The Script
- Guitars, keyboards and programming – Andrew Frampton
- Bass – Ben Sargeant

== Charts ==
=== Weekly charts ===
Chart (2010–2012)	Peak position
Australia (ARIA)	50
Belgium (Ultratip Bubbling Under Flanders)	26
Belgium (Ultratip Bubbling Under Wallonia)	25
Canada Hot 100 (Billboard)	80
Canada Hot AC (Billboard)	23
Hungary (Rádiós Top 40)	25
Ireland (IRMA)	15
Netherlands (Dutch Top 40)	12
Netherlands (Single Top 100)	70
New Zealand (Recorded Music NZ)	32
Scotland Singles (OCC)	28
UK Singles (OCC)	42
US Billboard Hot 100	32
US Adult Contemporary (Billboard)	13
US Adult Pop Airplay (Billboard)	3
US Pop Airplay (Billboard)	19

=== Year-end charts ===
Chart (2011)	Position
Netherlands (Dutch Top 40)	66
US Adult Top 40 (Billboard)	25
Chart (2012)	Position
US Adult Contemporary (Billboard)	47
US Adult Top 40 (Billboard)	49

== Certifications ==
Region	Certification	Certified units/sales
Australia (ARIA)	Platinum	70,000^{‡}
New Zealand (RMNZ)	Gold	7,500^{*}
United Kingdom (BPI)	Silver	200,000^{‡}
United States (RIAA)	Gold	500,000^{*}
^{*} Sales figures based on certification alone.^{‡} Sales+streaming figures based on certification alone.

== Release history ==
Release dates and formats for "Nothing"
Region	Date	Format	Label(s)	Ref.
United States	July 26, 2011	Mainstream airplay	Epic	
