= For the First Time (The Script song) =

2010 single by the Script

Single by the Script

from the album Science & Faith
- Released: 20 August 2010
- Recorded: 2010
- Genre: Pop rock
- Length: 4:11
- Label: Epic; Phonogenic
- Songwriters: Danny O'Donoghue; Mark Sheehan
- Producers: Danny O'Donoghue; Mark Sheehan; Andrew Frampton

The Script singles chronology
"Before the Worst" (2009)	"For the First Time" (2010)	"Nothing" (2010)

"For the First Time" is a song by Irish pop rock band the Script. Written by band members Danny O'Donoghue and Mark Sheehan, the song was released on 20 August 2010 as the lead single from the band's second studio album Science & Faith. It debuted at number one on the Irish Singles Chart, becoming the Script's first number-one single. The Wanted covered this song live on BBC Radio 1 Live Lounge and used that version in their EP Lose My Mind.

== Background ==
Danny O'Donoghue told the story behind the song in an interview with Merrick, Dools & Ricki-Lee on Sydney radio station Nova 96.9. Said O'Donoghue: "The song 'For the First Time' was about a time when we got back after touring around the world. We wanted to press palms with the people who had really gotten us there, and we got home and realised there's a stark reality out there, the recession, people are losing their jobs and their valuable things, and we thought, it almost pales in comparison to your news. We started the song, and it ended up being a bit bleak and we felt we really needed a great message in these, to turn it around... so we needed a message of hope, as people are being stripped of all these things they're realizing what's really important. It's all about going back to basics: drinking cheap wine, eating your dinner off the floor. That's when you meet each other for the first time, when you have nothing."

The song was sampled by the band on the track "Good Ol' Days" from their third studio album 3 (2012). The song was also sampled by rapper Machine Gun Kelly, or MGK, for his track "Her Song" off of the "EST 4 Life" (2012) mixtape.

== Music video ==
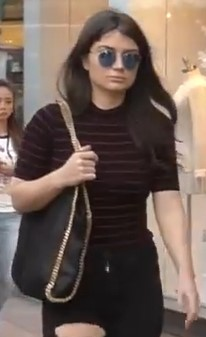
Eve Hewson appears in the music video.

The music video features band members of the Script within a studio and clips of a couple who have emigrated from Ireland to New York City. The characters in the music video are played by Eve Hewson, daughter of U2's Bono, and Luke Treadaway. The video was inspired by O. Henry's short story The Gift of the Magi.

== Chart performance ==
"For the First Time" debuted on the Irish Singles Chart at number one on 10 September 2010, knocking Katy Perry's "Teenage Dream" from the top spot. This marks the band's first number-one single and third top-ten hit in Ireland. On its second week on the chart, the single remained at the top spot. The single debuted at number five on the UK Singles Chart before moving up to number four the following week. In Australia, "For the First Time" debuted and peaked at number 12 on the Australian ARIA Singles Chart. It reached number four on the US Billboard Adult Top 40 chart and number 23 on the Billboard Hot 100. This is their third song that has hit both of these charts. The song was certified Gold in the U.S. by the RIAA, meaning the song has been downloaded 500,000 times. As of June 2011, the song was sold 1,000,000 times in the United States.

== Track listing ==
- CD single
1. "For The First Time" – 4:11
2. "Breakeven" (Live at Shepherd's Bush Empire) – 4:30
- Digital download
1. "For The First Time" – 4:11
2. "For The First Time" (Music Video) – 4:41

== Personnel ==
- Songwriting and production – Danny O'Donoghue, Mark Sheehan
- Additional production, additional keyboards and guitars – Andrew Frampton
- Drums, guitars, keyboards and vocals – the Script
- Bass – Ben Sargeant

== Charts ==
=== Weekly charts ===
Chart (2010–2011)	Peak position
Australia (ARIA)	12
Belgium (Ultratip Bubbling Under Flanders)	2
Belgium (Ultratip Bubbling Under Wallonia)	23
Canada Hot 100 (Billboard)	30
Canada AC (Billboard)	9
Canada CHR/Top 40 (Billboard)	28
Canada Hot AC (Billboard)	20
Denmark (Tracklisten)	39
European Hot 100 Singles	11
Germany (GfK)	83
Hungary (Rádiós Top 40)	29
Ireland (IRMA)	1
Netherlands (Single Top 100)	14
New Zealand (Recorded Music NZ)	20
Scottish Singles Sales (Official Charts)	2
Switzerland (Schweizer Hitparade)	37
UK Singles (Official Charts)	4
US Billboard Hot 100	23
US Adult Contemporary (Billboard)	5
US Adult Pop Airplay (Billboard)	3
US Pop Airplay (Billboard)	11

=== Year-end charts ===
Chart (2010)	Position
Australia (ARIA)	71
Italy Airplay (EarOne)	41
UK Singles (OCC)	71

Chart (2011)	Position
US Billboard Hot 100	66
US Adult Contemporary (Billboard)	10
US Adult Top 40 (Billboard)	4
US Mainstream Top 40 (Billboard)	50

Chart (2012)	Position
US Adult Contemporary (Billboard)	38

== Certifications ==
Region	Certification	Certified units/sales
Australia (ARIA)	2× Platinum	140,000^{‡}
Denmark (IFPI Danmark)	Gold	45,000^{‡}
Italy (FIMI)	Gold	25,000^{‡}
New Zealand (RMNZ)	Platinum	30,000^{‡}
United Kingdom (BPI)	Platinum	600,000^{‡}
United States (RIAA)	Platinum	1,489,000
^{‡} Sales+streaming figures based on certification alone.

== See also ==
- List of number-one singles of 2010 (Ireland)
