= We Cry =

2008 single by the Script

Single by the Script

from the album The Script
- Released: 25 April 2008 (Ireland); 2 May 2008 (UK); 6 June 2008 (Europe)
- Recorded: 2005–07
- Genre: Pop rock
- Length: 3:45
- Label: RCA Label Group; Phonogenic
- Songwriters: Andrew Frampton; Danny O'Donoghue; Glen Power; Mark Sheehan; Steve Kipner
- Producers: Frampton; Kipner

The Script singles chronology
"We Cry" (2008)	"The Man Who Can't Be Moved" (2008)

Audio sample
- file; help

"We Cry" is the debut single of Irish band the Script. The single was released on 25 April 2008 and is said to be about people whom the band's frontman Danny O'Donoghue knew while growing up in Dublin. The song received a large amount of publicity (such as appearing in 90210), airplay and interest with BBC Radio 1 heavily backing the band.

== Inspiration ==
Vocalist Danny O'Donoghue has said that the song reflects the tough times that life has in store. On 4Music's 4Play he referred to the loss of his father five months after a bandmate lost his mother to a terrible illness and claimed that such events could be overcome if people stuck together. A remix by one of the members of the band Rogue Traders, James Ash was released in 2009.

== Music video ==
The music video opens with various screenshots of an urban area in New York City which appears to be heavily graffitied. There are also shots of the full band playing their musical instruments in a flat room. However, the video quickly centres around Danny as he begins to sing while walking about the city. There are a few shots of the whole band playing the song in the flat but the main part of the video in this area is when Mark sings his verse. Although the video was uploaded to the Script's YouTube channel on 27 February 2008, the song became available to download on 18 March 2008 on the Irish iTunes Store, the video is available to download from iTunes.

== Live performances ==
- The band performed the song on the Australian breakfast television show Sunrise in October 2008, marking their debut performance on Australian television.
- As a support act for U2 on the third concert of their 360° Tour at Croke Park, the band included this song in their set.

== Track listing ==
- CD single / Digital single
1. "We Cry" – 3:43
2. "Fall For Anything" – 4:34
- German CD single
1. "We Cry" – 3:43
2. "Fall For Anything" – 4:34
3. "Live Like We're Dying" – 4:01
4. "We Cry" (Music Video) – 3:43
- Digital EP
1. "We Cry" – 3:43
2. "Fall For Anything" – 4:34
3. "We Cry" (Live Mix) – 4:16
- Digital Remix EP
1. "We Cry" (Bimbo Jones Remix) – 5:24
2. "We Cry" (Bimbo Jones Dub) – 7:10
3. "We Cry" (Ashanti Boyz Club Mix) – 5:12
4. "We Cry" (Ashanti Boyz Dub) – 5:13
5. "We Cry" (Ashanti Boyz Radio Edit) – 3:11
6. "We Cry" (Afrojanic Remix) – 3:51

== Charts and certifications ==
=== Weekly charts ===
Chart (2008)	Peak position
Australia (ARIA)	82
Belgium (Ultratip Bubbling Under Flanders)	14
Belgium (Ultratip Bubbling Under Wallonia)	19
Denmark (Tracklisten)	6
Germany (GfK)	61
Hungary (Rádiós Top 40)	20
Ireland (IRMA)	9
Japan Hot 100 (Billboard)	45
Scotland Singles (OCC)	13
Sweden (Sverigetopplistan)	25
Switzerland (Schweizer Hitparade)	56
UK Singles (OCC)	15

=== Year-end charts ===
Chart (2008)	Position
UK Singles (Official Charts Company)	128

=== Certifications ===
Region	Certification	Certified units/sales
Italy (FIMI)	Platinum	20,000
United Kingdom (BPI)	Silver	200,000^{‡}
^{‡} Sales+streaming figures based on certification alone.
