= Sunsets & Full Moons =

Studio album by The Script
- Released: 8 November 2019
- Genre: Pop
- Length: 30:20
- Label: Sony
- Producer: Danny O'Donoghue; David Lucius King; Jimbo Barry; Mark Sheehan; Samuel Tsang

The Script chronology
Acoustic Sessions (2018)	Sunsets & Full Moons (2019)	Acoustic Sessions 2 (2021)

Singles from Sunsets & Full Moons
- 1. "The Last Time" Released: 20 September 2019; 2. "Run Through Walls" Released: 10 January 2020

Sunsets & Full Moons is the sixth studio album by Irish rock band The Script, released 8 November 2019 through Sony Music Entertainment. It was supported by the lead single "The Last Time". The Script embarked on a European tour in 2020 in promotion of the album, with Becky Hill acting as a support act. It was the last studio album to feature guitarist Mark Sheehan before his death in 2023.

== Background ==
The band consider the album to be a sequel to their self-titled debut album, released in 2008, as both were "written and recorded following traumatic personal events" for lead singer Danny O'Donoghue, whose parents both died ten years apart. O'Donoghue called the album the "most poignant record we've ever made", and said "Our music was always about being together with the audience, and writing about your own feelings, and sharing them."

== Track listing ==
No.	Title	Writer(s)	Length
1.	"Something Unreal"	Daniel O'Donoghue; Mark Sheehan; James Barry	3:31
2.	"The Last Time"	O'Donoghue; Sheehan; Barry; James Abrahart	3:16
3.	"Run Through Walls"	O'Donoghue; Sheehan; Barry; David King	3:26
4.	"If You Don't Love Yourself"	O'Donoghue; Sheehan; Barry; King	2:45
5.	"Hurt People Hurt People"	O'Donoghue; Sheehan; Barry; King	3:07
6.	"Same Time"	O'Donoghue; Sheehan; Abrahart; Steven James; Dale Anthoni	3:17
7.	"Underdog"	O'Donoghue; Sheehan; Barry	3:37
8.	"The Hurt Game"	O'Donoghue; Sheehan; Camille Purcell	3:48
9.	"Hot Summer Nights"	O'Donoghue; Sheehan; Barry; Shaun Farrugia	3:33
Total length:			30:20

== Charts ==
=== Weekly charts ===
Chart (2019)	Peak position
Australian Albums (ARIA)	11
Belgian Albums (Ultratop Flanders)	22
Belgian Albums (Ultratop Wallonia)	125
Dutch Albums (Album Top 100)	8
German Albums (Offizielle Top 100)	92
Irish Albums (IRMA)	1
Portuguese Albums (AFP)	24
Scottish Albums (OCC)	2
Swiss Albums (Schweizer Hitparade)	28
UK Albums (OCC)	1

=== Year-end charts ===
Chart (2019)	Position
Irish Albums (IRMA)	43

== Certifications ==
Region	Certification	Certified units/sales
United Kingdom (BPI)	Gold	100,000^{‡}
^{‡} Sales+streaming figures based on certification alone.
