= Talk You Down =

Single by the Script

from the album The Script
- Released: 16 March 2009
- Recorded: 2007
- Genre: Pop rock
- Length: 3:50
- Label: Sony Music
- Songwriter(s): Sheehan; Power; O'Donoghue
- Producer(s): Mark Sheehan

The Script singles chronology
"Breakeven" (2008)	"Talk You Down" (2009)	"Before the Worst" (2009)

"Talk You Down" is a song by Irish rock band the Script, released as the fourth single from their self-titled debut album The Script. The track was released on 16 March 2009. "Talk You Down" peaked at #47 on the UK Singles Chart, in March 2009.

== Track listing ==
- CD single
1. "Talk You Down" – 3:50
2. "None The Wiser" (Demo Version) – 3:18
3. "Before The Worst" (Armand Van Helden Remix) – 3:23
4. "Talk You Down" (Music Video) – 3:50
- Digital download
1. "Talk You Down" – 3:50
2. "Talk You Down" (Music Video) – 3:50
- "UK Promo"
1. "Talk You Down" – 3:50

== Charts ==
Chart (2009)	Peak position
Ireland (IRMA)	19
UK Singles (OCC)	47
