= Before the Worst =

2009 single by the Script

Single by the Script

from the album The Script
- Released: 20 June 2009
- Recorded: 2006
- Genre: Indie rock
- Length: 3:23
- Label: Sony Music
- Songwriter(s): Sheehan; Power; O' Donoghue
- Producer(s): Mark Sheehan

The Script singles chronology
"Talk You Down" (2009)	"Before the Worst" (2009)	"For the First Time" (2010)

"Before the Worst" is a song by the Irish band the Script, released as the fifth and final single from their self-titled debut album. The single peaked within the top 10 in Australia and was certified Platinum; in their home country of Ireland, "Before the Worst" peaked at 37. A music video was filmed in Belfast, Northern Ireland, and premiered on Channel 4 as part of T4.

== Live performances ==
- As a support act for U2 on the third concert of their 360° Tour at Croke Park, the band opened their set with this song.
- The band performed the song during half-time of the 2009 NRL Grand Final in Sydney, Australia.

== Track listings ==
- 7-inch vinyl
1. "Before The Worst" – 3:23
2. "Bullet From A Gun" – 4:10
- CD single
1. "Before The Worst" – 3:23
2. "Bullet From A Gun" – 4:10
- Australian CD single
1. "Before The Worst" – 3:23
2. "Before The Worst" (Armand Van Helden Remix) – 5:46
3. "Before The Worst" (Live at the Islington Academy, 8 April 2008) – 4:03
4. "Before The Worst" (Demo Version) – 3:11

== Charts ==
=== Weekly charts ===
Chart (2009)	Peak position
Australia (ARIA)	10
Ireland (IRMA)	37
UK Singles (OCC)	96

=== Year-end charts ===
Chart (2009)	Position
Australia (ARIA)	89

== Certifications ==
Region	Certification	Certified units/sales
Australia (ARIA)	Platinum	70,000^{^}
^{^} Shipments figures based on certification alone.

== See also ==
- List of top 10 singles for 2009 in Australia
