= The Script =

Irish rock band

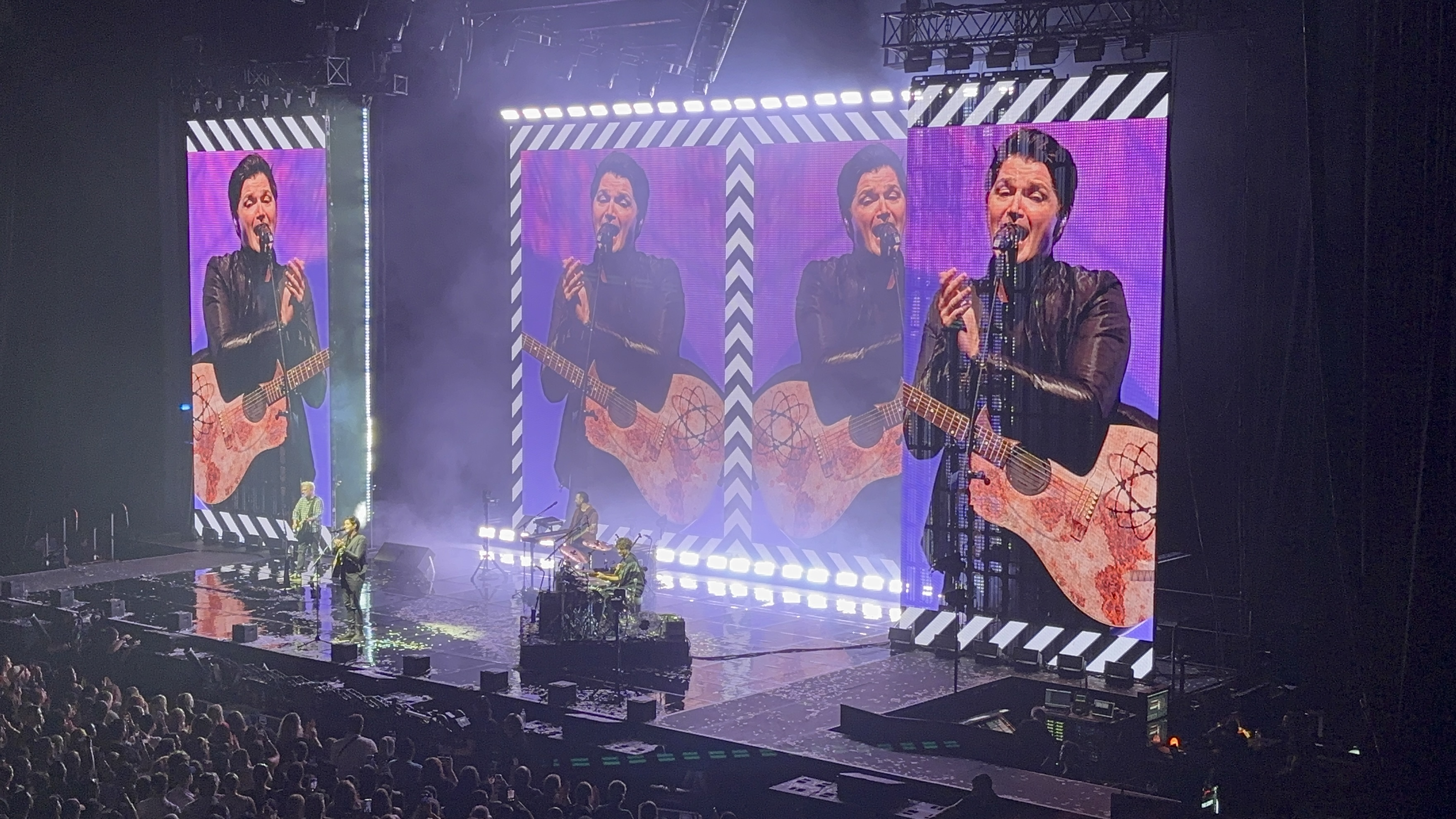
- The Script performing in Sydney, Australia, in January 2025

Background information
- Origin: Dublin, Ireland
- Genres: Pop rock; soft rock; indie rock
- Works: Discography
- Years active: 2001–present
- Labels: Phonogenic; Epic; RCA; Columbia
- Spinoff of: Mytown
- Members: Danny O'Donoghue; Glen Power; Benjamin Sargeant; Ben Weaver
- Past members: Mark Sheehan
- Website: thescriptmusic.com

The Script are an Irish pop rock band formed in 2001 in Dublin by lead vocalist and keyboardist Danny O'Donoghue, lead guitarist Mark Sheehan and drummer Glen Power. The band currently consists of O'Donoghue (lead vocals, guitar, piano, keyboards), Power (drums, percussion, backing vocals), Benjamin Sargeant (bass, backing vocals) and Ben Weaver (guitar). Sheehan (guitar, vocals) was a member of the band up until his death in 2023. The band moved to London after signing to Sony Label Group imprint Phonogenic and released their first album The Script in August 2008, preceded by the debut single "We Cry" as well as other singles such as "The Man Who Can't Be Moved", "Breakeven" and "Before the Worst". The album peaked at number one in both Ireland and the UK.

Their next three albums, Science & Faith (2010), #3 (2012) and No Sound Without Silence (2014), all topped the album charts in Ireland and the UK, while Science & Faith reached number two in Australia and number three in the United States. Some of the hit singles from the albums include "For the First Time", "Nothing", "Hall of Fame" and "Superheroes". The band's fifth studio album, Freedom Child, was released on 1 September 2017, and features the UK Top 20 single "Rain". Their sixth studio album, Sunsets & Full Moons, was released on 8 November 2019, and features the single "The Last Time". A Greatest Hits album was released on 1 October 2021.

The Script's music has been featured in television programmes such as 90210, Ghost Whisperer, The Hills, Waterloo Road, EastEnders, Made in Chelsea and The Vampire Diaries. Frontman Danny O'Donoghue was also a coach on The Voice UK for seasons 1 and 2, before leaving the show in order to focus more on the band. The band has won three Meteor Ireland Music Awards and two World Music Awards and have received two Brit Award nominations. The Script have sold over 20 million albums worldwide.

On 14 April 2023, band co-founder Mark Sheehan died of a brief illness at the age of 46.

== History ==
=== Early years ===
Danny O'Donoghue and Mark Sheehan had been best friends since they were 12 growing up in Dublin. They were formerly part of a boy band called Mytown, formed in 1996. Striking up a songwriting and production partnership, they were invited to Canada to collaborate with some of their heroes, including Dallas Austin, Montell Jordan and Teddy Riley. They were in the US for a few years and got a record deal until the company split and dropped them.

They stayed in Los Angeles and worked there as producers, writing and producing songs for performers including Britney Spears, Boyz II Men and TLC, but later moved back to Dublin, where they formed the Script with drummer Glen Power. Power learned to play drums when he was just eight and he had been playing sessions from the age of 15, using the money to work on a solo project in his home, but that went on hold when his collaboration with Sheehan and O'Donoghue produced three songs in one week. The band signed to Phonogenic in 2005, and released an EP on Last.FM. The band's influences include Snow Patrol, U2, Coldplay, the Police, the Neptunes, Timbaland, and Van Morrison.

=== 2008–2010: The Script ===
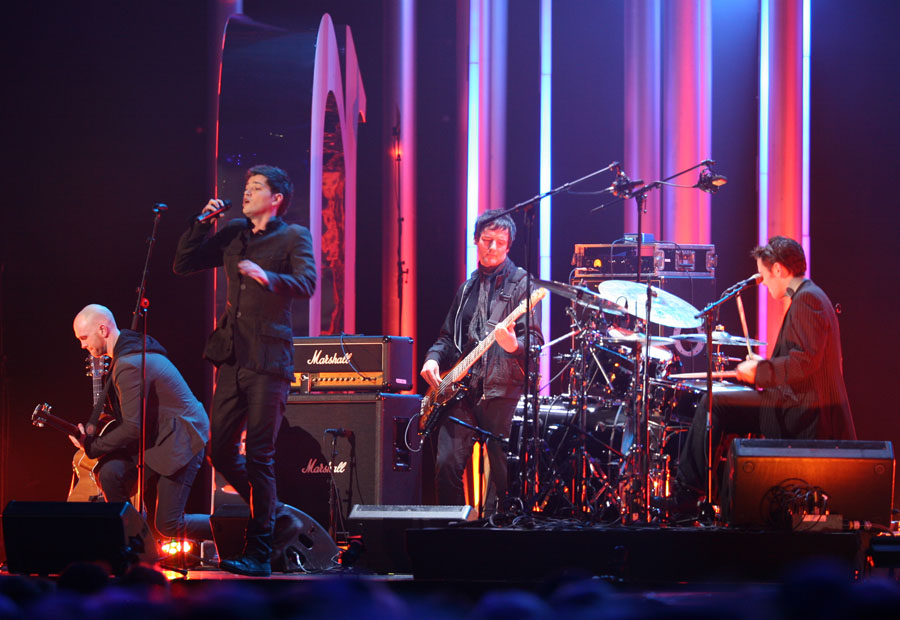
The Script performing at Nobel Peace Prize Concert,in 2008

The Script's eponymous debut album was released on 8 August 2008. The album debuted at the number one spot on the UK's album charts.

The Script performed "We Cry" for the first time on BalconyTV in Dublin on 13 September 2007. The band claimed that BalconyTV was the "first TV they ever did" and credited Michael Hunter as the "push we needed to propel us" when they won Best Band at the DanishTV Music Video Awards 2009 in the Pepper Club Dublin on 20 June 2008. At the awards the band said the award was their "first ever". The Script released their debut single "We Cry" on 25 April 2008. "We Cry" received "Single of the Day" on RTÉ 2FM, Today FM and by Jo Whiley on BBC Radio 1, where many radio presenters heavily supported the band. The single peaked at number 15 on the UK Singles Chart, giving the band their first top 20 single. The track also performed well on the Irish Singles Chart, peaking at number 9 and giving the band their first top ten single in their home country. The Script also performed "We Cry" on one of the CW's TV series, 90210.

Their second single, "The Man Who Can't Be Moved", was released on 15 September 2008. The single reached number 2 in Ireland, Denmark, and the UK. The band released their debut album, The Script, on 11 August 2008. Following the success of "The Man Who Can't Be Moved", the album entered the UK Albums Chart at number one with sales of 20,240 copies where it stayed for 11 weeks. The album spent three weeks in the top ten and was the 18th best selling album in the UK of 2008. The album also entered the Irish Albums Chart at number one, holding the top spot for five weeks. The Irish office of Sony BMG music presented the group with their first multi-platinum disc for over 600,000 sales of their debut album.

The band's third single, "Breakeven", was released in Ireland and UK on 21 November 2008 and 29 December 2008 respectively. The single was an instant success on the Irish Singles Chart. After entering the chart at number 40, it spent one week before entering the top ten at number 10, giving the Script their third top ten single in Ireland. The single spent four weeks on the UK Singles Chart, peaking at number 21. The band's next two singles, "Talk You Down" and "Before the Worst", were released in March and July 2009, respectively.

On 4 October, the Script performed "Before the Worst" at half-time of the 2009 NRL Grand Final in Sydney, Australia, in their first visit to the country.

On 9 November the Script received an award at the World Music Awards for Best-Selling Irish Act of 2008 and on 19 February 2010, they won Best Live Performance at the Meteor Ireland Music Awards.

The band played at the Cheerios Childline concert, headlined by Enrique Iglesias and Anastacia, on the opening night of Dublin's The O2 in 2008. The Script supported Take That at their concert at Croke Park on 13 June 2009. On 27 July, the band supported U2 on their third concert at Croke Park. On 17, 18 and 21 July 2009, the Script opened for Paul McCartney at the first concerts at New York's Citi Field.

The band's popularity reached the attention of other artists. In March 2008, the band announced they planned to write a track for Leona Lewis's second album, Echo, but in 2010, Sheehan revealed that they had "missed the mark" on the album's release date and that they submitted their song too late. While Sheehan believed Lewis's record company loved their song, he said, he felt "they thought it was a little dark for her".

The band's bonus track and B-side "Live Like We're Dying" was re-recorded by American Idol 2009 winner Kris Allen as the first single from his self-titled album.

A remixed version of the band's single "The Man Who Can't Be Moved" was featured during the Victoria's Secret Fashion Show 2009.

On 16 April 2010, their first US single "Breakeven" was certified Platinum by the Recording Industry Association of America, selling over one million copies in the US; the song peaked at No. 12 on the Billboard Hot 100 in the spring of 2010. The band performed a headline tour in the United States that kicked off in San Diego on 11 October 2010 at the House of Blues and ended on 7 November 2010 at the House of Blues in Boston, Massachusetts.

=== 2010–2012: Science & Faith ===
The first single from Science & Faith, "For the First Time", was released in the UK on 20 August 2010 and the album followed on 13 September 2010. In the United States, "For the First Time" was released on iTunes on 8 November 2010, with "Science & Faith" was released on 18 January 2011. The song was first released in the United States on AOL Music on 29 September 2010. The group invited UK media into the recording session and discussed their process of creating the album. "For the First Time" entered the UK charts at No. 5, moved up to No. 4 the following week and entered the Irish charts at No. 1. The music video features Bono's daughter Eve Hewson. Science & Faith entered the Irish Album Chart and the UK album chart at No. 1.

The Script also took part in Children in Need 2010 and BRMB's live 2010. They were nominated for Best International Act at the 2011 Brit Awards. They later went on to play their official biggest crowd on 2 July 2011 in Dublin's Aviva Stadium, and performed to a sold-out crowd of 50,000 people.

=== 2012–2014: #3 ===
The band's third album was titled #3. It was released in the UK on 10 September 2012 and in the United States on 9 October 2012. "Hall of Fame" was the lead single, which debuted on radio on 23 July 2012. It was recorded in Los Angeles, Studio 3, and released on iTunes on 21 August 2012. The single features will.i.am, whom Danny works alongside on The Voice UK. The song became their most successful to date, being certified 5× Platinum in Australia, Platinum in Italy, 2× Platinum in New Zealand, 6× Platinum in Norway, 2× Platinum in Sweden and 2× Platinum in the US. The song also peaked at number 1 in the UK, Scotland, Ireland, Europe and Austria, and charted in over 30 countries. It is their highest-charting single to date worldwide.

Other singles include "Six Degrees of Separation" and "If You Could See Me Now", a tribute to O'Donoghue's father and Sheehan's parents. On 16 September 2012, the Script achieved their first UK number one for a period of two weeks with their single "Hall of Fame" in its second week after being released.

On 5 October 2012, the Script kicked off the Major League Baseball Postseason by playing a free concert at the MLB Fan Cave in New York City. The Script was nominated for Best International band at the 2013 BRIT Awards.

The Script recorded a song for Mrs. Brown's Boys D'Movie called Hail, Rain or Sunshine.

=== 2014–2016: No Sound Without Silence ===
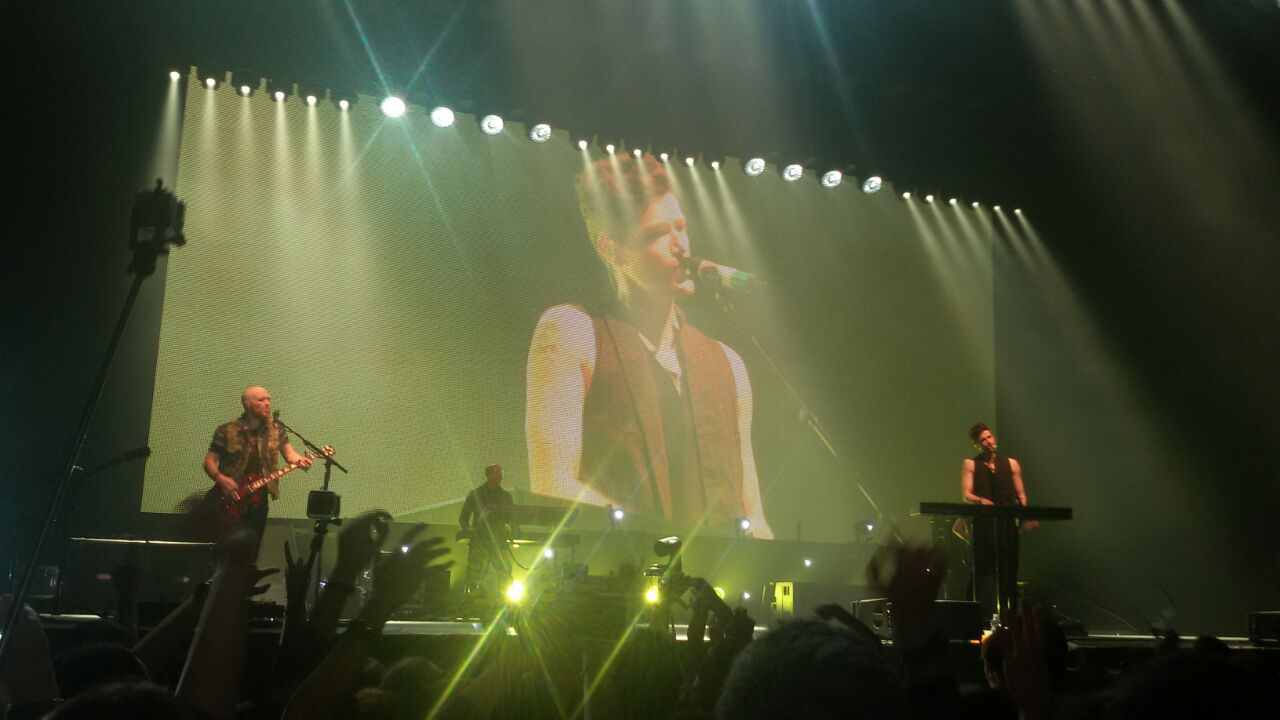
The band performing on their No Sound Without Silence tour in Barcelona, Spain in 2015

The band's fourth studio album was titled No Sound Without Silence and the lead single from the album, "Superheroes", was released on 22 July 2014. The album has been described by O'Donoghue as a prequel to their debut album, with many of the songs being recorded on the road. The album was released on 12 September 2014.

Other singles from the album include "No Good in Goodbye", which was released on 15 October 2014 and "Man on a Wire" which was released on 15 March 2015.

The band's tour for this album. titled the "No Sound Without Silence Tour" occurred from 16 January 2015 through 18 September 2015. Throughout the tour, the band played a total of 56 total shows, and performed within Africa, Asia, Europe, Oceania, and North America.

Immediately after the tour, the band went on a nearly year-long unannounced hiatus. O'Donoghue didn't reveal this information until July 2017 and claimed that the hiatus occurred due to the band wanting some time off to "chill" after making four albums and going on five world tours. Shortly after this announcement, it was revealed that another reason the band went on hiatus was due to O'Donoghue needing throat surgery.

=== 2017–2019: Freedom Child ===
Beginning in early 2017, the band began teasing their new fifth album. They did so by releasing a couple of sneak peeks of songs from the album throughout the year. A sneak peek of a song titled "Divided States of America" was released on 5 January 2017. A few months later, a sneak peek of a song titled "Written in the Scars" was released on 8 June 2017. On 13 July 2017, the band officially announced the lead single from the album, "Rain". The song was released on 14 July 2017. On 21 July 2017, it was announced that the new album would be titled Freedom Child. The album was put up for pre-order that same day. It contains 14 tracks and was released on 1 September 2017.

Prior to the album's release, two promotional singles were released to further promote the album. On 25 August 2017, "Written in the Scars" was released as the first promotional single from the album. A few days later, on 30 August 2017, "Love Not Lovers" was released as the second promotional single from the album.

Upon release, the album received mixed to negative reviews from critics upon release, but still managed top the charts in some countries. The album hit number one in Ireland, Scotland, and the United Kingdom, their third album to do so.

The song "Arms Open" was released as the second single from the album on 13 November 2017. A music video for the song was released on 1 December 2017.

The tour for the album, simply titled "Freedom Child Tour", took place between September 2017 and June 2018.

On 16 March 2018, the band released a live cover of the Aslan song "Crazy World" featuring Christy Dignam, the lead singer of Aslan. This single was featured on an acoustic EP titled Acoustic Sessions, which also feature the songs "No Man is an Island", "Never Seen Anything 'Quite Like You'", and "The Man Who Can't Be Moved". The full EP was released on 18 April 2018.

=== 2019–2021: Sunsets & Full Moons ===
Beginning on 13 September 2019, the band began teasing a new album on Twitter. A few days later, on 19 September 2019, the band announced the lead single from the album, "The Last Time". The single and an accompanying music video were released on 20 September 2019.

On 11 October 2019, the band announced that the album would be titled Sunsets & Full Moons and consist of nine songs. The album was made available for pre-order the same day. It was released on 8 November 2019.

On 1 November 2019, "Something Unreal" was released as the first promotional single from the album.

In December 2019, The Script performed at the Jingle Bell Ball, alongside other artists such as Ava Max, Rita Ora, Regard and Mabel.

On 10 January 2020, "Run Through Walls" was released as the second single from the album. A music video for the song was released the same day.

On 11 March 2021, the band released an acoustic version of "For the First Time", which would serve as the lead single off of their second acoustic EP titled Acoustic Sessions 2. The remainder of the EP was released on 17 March 2021.

=== 2021–2023: Tales from the Script: Greatest Hits & Mark Sheehan's death ===
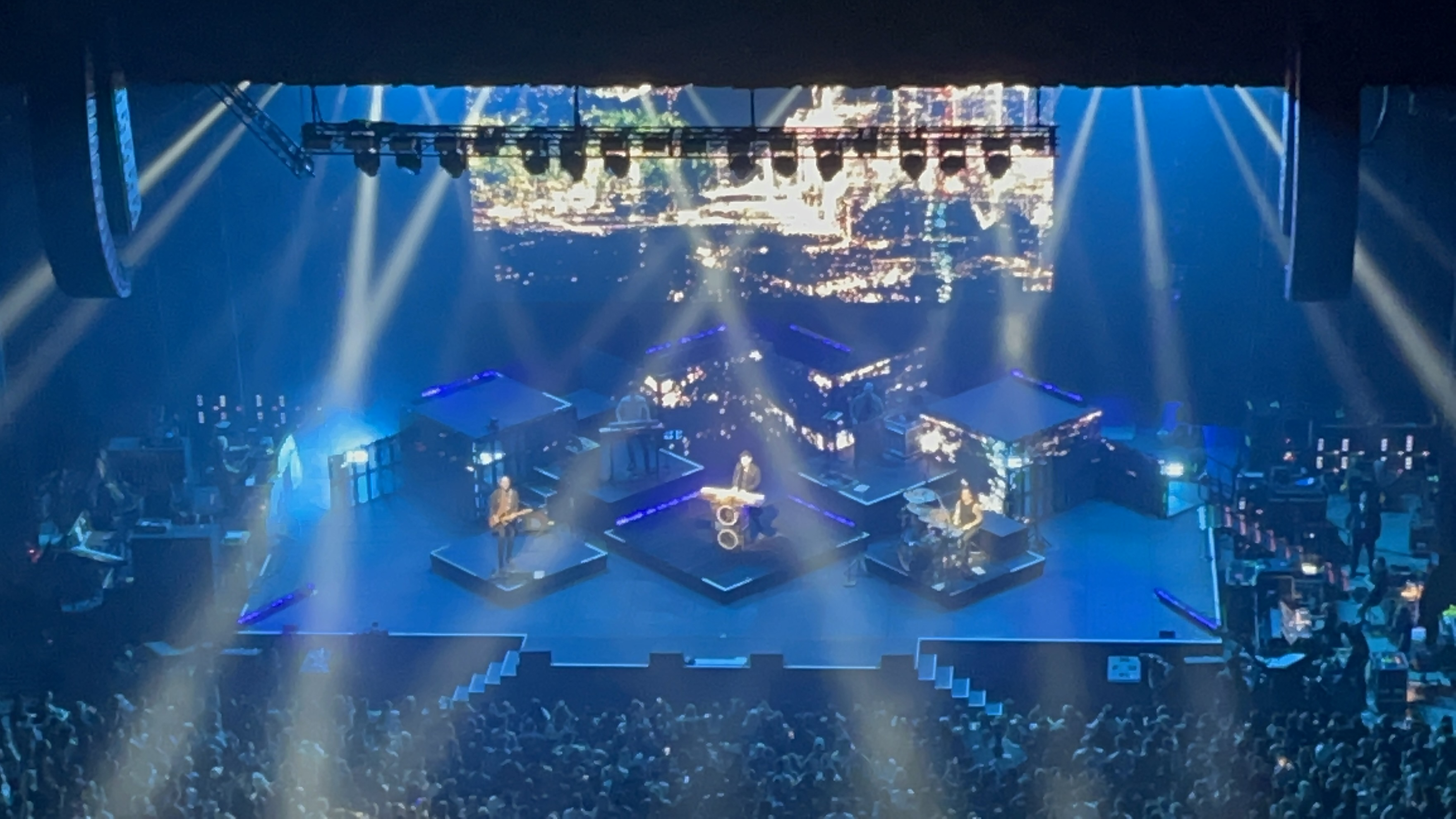
The Script performing in Sydney, Australia in September 2022.

Beginning in late August 2021, the band began teasing a new song on their website and Twitter page. The song, "I Want It All", was released on 27 August along with an announcement for a greatest hits album, Tales from the Script: Greatest Hits. The announcement set the album's release date for 1 October 2021; a worldwide tour was also announced in support of the album, beginning in Los Angeles on 30 March 2022 and concluding in Lisbon, Portugal on 18 November 2022.

In November 2021, the Script performed at Hits Live in Liverpool, alongside other artists such as Mimi Webb, Mabel, Becky Hill, Joel Corry, Tom Grennan, Ella Henderson and Ed Sheeran.

On 10 February 2022, the band released an acoustic version of "I Want It All", which would serve as the lead single off of their third acoustic EP titled Acoustic Sessions 3. "Superheroes" was released as the second single from the EP on 11 March 2022. The remainder of the EP was released on 17 March 2022. The remaining songs that are included are "Paint the Town Green" and "Good Ol' Days".

The band toured in 2022. Mark Sheehan missed the U.S. leg of the tour. Danny O'Donoghue later attributed Sheehan's absence to family commitments.

On 14 April 2023, lead guitarist and backing vocalist Mark Sheehan died at aged 46 in hospital after a brief illness.

=== 2024–2025: Satellites ===
On 8 May 2024, the band announced a new single titled Both Ways on X, their first single since Sheehan's death. The following day, they announced that long-time supporting tour member Ben Sargeant and newcomer Ben Weaver would be joining the band as their bassist and lead guitarist, respectively, as they felt being a trio "would never be the same". The single was released on 17 May 2024.

The second single off the album, titled At Your Feet, was released on 19 July, 2024.

Their seventh studio album, titled Satellites, was released on 16 August 2024. They embarked on a world tour in support of the album, kicking off in the United States of America (where they also opened for Pink on her Summer Carnival Tour) and also traversing through Europe, Australia and Asia.

=== 2026: The User's Guide to Being Human ===
The Script announced their upcoming studio album, The User's Guide to Being Human, and a world tour to go along with it. The lead single, Man In The Arena, was inspired by a speech by Theodore Roosevelt. Their eighth album, The User’s Guide to Being Human was released 14 August 2026.

== Band members ==
Current members

- Danny O'Donoghue – lead vocals, piano, keyboards, rhythm guitar (2001–present)
- Glen Power – drums, percussion, backing vocals (2001–present)
- Benjamin Sargeant – bass, backing vocals (2024–present; touring musician 2001–2024)
- Ben Weaver – lead guitar, backing vocals (2024–present)

Current touring musicians

- Adam Marcello – drums, percussion (2025–present; substitute for Glen Power)

Former members

- Mark Sheehan – lead guitar, backing and occasional lead vocals (2001–2023; his death)

Former touring musicians

- Luke Juby – keyboards (2017–2019)
- Curtis Stansfield – keyboards, percussion, backing vocals (2019–2024)
- Colin Rogers – lead guitar, backing vocals (2021–2024; substitute for Mark Sheehan 2021–2023)
- Adam Falkner – drums, percussion, backing vocals (2025; substitute for Glen Power)

== Discography ==
Studio albums

- The Script (2008)
- Science & Faith (2010)
- #3 (2012)
- No Sound Without Silence (2014)
- Freedom Child (2017)
- Sunsets & Full Moons (2019)
- Satellites (2024)
- The User's Guide to Being Human (2026)

Compilation albums

- Tales from The Script: Greatest Hits (2021)

Extended plays

- Acoustic Sessions (2018)
- Acoustic Sessions 2 (2021)
- Acoustic Sessions 3 (2022)

== Film ==
- Homecoming: Live at the Aviva Stadium, Dublin

== Tours ==
=== Headlining ===
- Science & Faith Tour (2010–11)
- #3 World Tour (2012–13)
- No Sound Without Silence Tour (2015)
- Freedom Child Tour (2017–18)
- Sunsets & Full Moons Tour (2020)
- Greatest Hits Tour (2022–23)
- Satellites World Tour (2024-2025)
- World Tour (2026)

=== Supporting ===
- My Kinda Saturday Night Tour (2026) (with Luke Combs, select dates)

== Awards and nominations ==
Year	Award	Category	Result
2008	World Music Awards	Best Selling Irish Act	Won
2009	Meteor Ireland Music Awards	Best Irish Band	Won
2009	Meteor Ireland Music Awards	Best Album – The Script	Won
2009	Meteor Ireland Music Awards	Best Irish Pop Act	Nominated
2009	EBBA Awards	Emerging Artist or Group of the Year	Won
2010	Meteor Ireland Music Awards	Best Live Performance	Won
2011	Brit Awards	Best International Group	Nominated
2011	Teen Choice Awards	Choice Music: Group	Nominated
2011	BMI Pop Awards	Pop Award for "Breakeven"	Won
2012	BMI Pop Awards	Pop Award for "For the First Time"	Won
2012	World Music Awards	Best International Group	Nominated
2013	Brit Awards	Best International Group	Nominated
2014	Meteor Choice Music	Song of the Year	Won
2014	BMI Pop Awards	Pop Award for "Hall of Fame"	Won
2014	World Music Awards	World's Best Group	Nominated
2014	World Music Awards	World's Best Live Act	Nominated
2014	World Music Awards	World's Best Album – #3	Nominated
2014	World Music Awards	World's Best Song – "Hall of Fame"	Nominated
2014	World Music Awards	World's Best Video – "Hall of Fame"	Nominated
2018	Global Awards	Best Group	Nominated
2018	Global Awards	Mass Appeal Award	Nominated
