= Science & Faith =

Second studio album by the Script

Studio album by the Script
- Released: 10 September 2010
- Studios: Sphere (London, England); Apogee's Berkeley Street (Los Angeles, US)
- Genre: Alternative rock
- Length: 42:12
- Labels: RCA; Epic; Phonogenic (US)
- Producers: Mark Sheehan; Danny O'Donoghue; Andrew Frampton; Steve Kipner

The Script chronology
iTunes Session (2010)	Science & Faith (2010)	iTunes Festival: London 2011 (2011)

Singles from Science & Faith
- 1. "For the First Time" Released: 20 August 2010; 2. "Nothing" Released: 19 November 2010; 3. "If You Ever Come Back" Released: 4 April 2011; 4. "Science & Faith" Released: 27 May 2011

Professional ratings
Aggregate scores
Source	Rating
Metacritic	60/100
Review scores
Source	Rating
AllMusic	3/5 stars
Melodic	3/5 stars
MusicOMH	3/5 stars
Rolling Stone	2.5/5 stars
Sputnikmusic	2.5/5 stars
The Telegraph	4/5 stars

Science & Faith is the second studio album by Irish rock band the Script. It was first released in Ireland on 10 September 2010 and on 18 January 2011 in the United States, via RCA Records. It was preceded by the lead single, "For the First Time", on 3 September 2010. It debuted at number one in Ireland and United Kingdom, selling 70,816 copies in its first week in the United Kingdom. In the United States, Science & Faith debuted at number three on the Billboard 200, their highest peak on the US chart, with first-week sales of 49,000 copies. The album has sold 314,000 copies in the US, and over 1.5 million worldwide. The album was met with mixed to positive reviews.

== Background ==
For the album's release in the United States, "Bullet from a Gun" was added to the track listing, and a remix of "Walk Away", featuring American rapper B.o.B, which was originally set to be a single stateside, was also added. On 16 October 2011, the album was re-released in Asia, in the form of a "Tour Edition", which again adds "Bullet from a Gun" to the track list, as well as a live version of "Science & Faith", and a bonus DVD containing the music videos for "For the First Time" and "Nothing", two behind the scenes segments, a director's cut video, a television performance clip, and a short documentary trailing the band's performance at Arthur's Day in Ireland. This particular version of the album has never been issued in Ireland or the UK.

== Singles ==
- "For the First Time" was released as the album's lead single in Ireland on 3 September 2010, and in the United Kingdom on 5 September. It debuted at number one in Ireland, becoming their first number-one single. The song went on to peak at two on the UK Singles Chart, originally entering the chart at five. The single's release was backed with a live version of "Breakeven" from the Shephard's Bush Empire concert. A version of "Rusty Halo" from the concert was earlier released as B-side to "The Man Who Can't Be Moved".
- "Nothing" was released as the second single from the album on 19 November 2010. It peaked at number 15 in Ireland and #42 in the United Kingdom, becoming the band's lowest charting single there to date. The single was heavily promoted, with a music video being released one and a half months prior to the single's release, and the song receiving heavy radio airplay from BBC Radio 2.
- "If You Ever Come Back" was released as the third single from the album on 4 April 2011. The single was promoted through a performance during the band's stint as house band on Jason Manford's Comedy Rocks! on 30 March. A music video was also filmed to promote the release, and despite being labelled by critics as one of the standout tracks from the album, it only peaked at number 115 on the UK Singles Chart, becoming the band's worst performing single ever.
- "Science & Faith" was released as the album's fourth and final single on 27 May 2011. The single was backed with a live version of the track from the Birmingham N.E.C, which was later included on the Asian Tour Edition of the album. It was being promoted through a performance of the track during the live stages of the fifth series of Britain's Got Talent.
- "Walk Away" was originally due to be released as a single in the United States, even being remixed to feature American rapper B.o.B. However, the release was cancelled, and the remix was instead included as a bonus track on the American edition of the album. "Walk Away" was never considered for release in any other territory.

== Commercial performance ==
The album started atop the Irish Albums Chart with 13,200 units. At this time, the Gold certification disc was attributed for 7,500 copies sold. The IRMA certified later the album five times platinum for 75,000 units sold. At the end of year, it ranked second on the biggest-selling albums chart in the country, behind Now That's What I Call Music! 77.

== Track listing ==
No.	Title	Writer(s)	Producer(s)	Length
1.	"You Won't Feel a Thing"	Danny O'Donoghue, Mark Sheehan, Steve Kipner, Andrew Frampton, Glen Power, Ben Sargeant	Sheehan, O'Donoghue, Frampton, Kipner	4:33
2.	"For the First Time"	O'Donoghue, Sheehan	O'Donoghue, Sheehan, Frampton*	4:12
3.	"Nothing"	O'Donoghue, Sheehan, Kipner, Frampton	Sheehan, O'Donoghue, Frampton, Kipner	4:32
4.	"Science & Faith"	O'Donoghue, Sheehan	Sheehan, O'Donoghue, Frampton*	4:20
5.	"If You Ever Come Back"	O'Donoghue, Sheehan, Kipner, Frampton	Sheehan, O'Donoghue, Frampton, Kipner	4:02
6.	"Long Gone and Moved On"	O'Donoghue, Sheehan, Power	O'Donoghue, Sheehan, Frampton*	4:17
7.	"Dead Man Walking"	O'Donoghue, Sheehan	O'Donoghue, Sheehan	3:54
8.	"This = Love"	O'Donoghue, Sheehan, Power, Sargeant	O'Donoghue, Sheehan	4:21
9.	"Walk Away" (US edition of the album has the version featuring B.o.B as this track)	O'Donoghue, Sheehan, Power, Sargeant, Bobby Ray Simmons Jr.	Danny O'Donoghue, Mark Sheehan	3:36
10.	"Exit Wounds"	O'Donoghue, Sheehan, Kipner, Frampton	Sheehan, O'Donoghue, Frampton, Kipner	4:25
Total length:				42:12

American edition bonus tracks
No.	Title	Writer(s)	Producer(s)	Length
11.	"Bullet from a Gun"	O'Donoghue, Sheehan, Power	O'Donoghue, Sheehan, Frampton*	3:21
12.	"Walk Away" (no rap version)	O'Donoghue, Sheehan, Power, Sargeant	O'Donoghue, Sheehan	3:36
Total length:				49:09

Asian tour edition bonus tracks
No.	Title	Writer(s)	Producer(s)	Length
11.	"Bullet from a Gun"	O'Donoghue, Sheehan, Power	O'Donoghue, Sheehan, Frampton*	3:21

Asian tour edition bonus DVD
No.	Title	Length
1.	"For the First Time" (music video)	4:41
2.	"For the First Time" (director's cut video)	5:12
3.	"For the First Time" (live performance clip)	5:18
4.	"For the First Time" (making of the video)	3:00
5.	"Nothing" (music video)	4:32
6.	"Nothing" (making of the video)	3:00
7.	"Arthur's Day" (live footage from Dublin)	11:22
Total length:		37:05

(*) Additional production

== Personnel ==
Adapted from the album's liner notes.

- Danny O'Donoghue – vocals, production and strings arrangement
- Mark Sheehan – guitars, production
- Steve Kipner – production
- Andrew Frampton – production and additional production, programming, keyboards and additional keyboards, guitars
- Glen Power – drummer
- Ben Sargeant –bass
- The Script – drums, guitars, keyboards, vocals and programming
- Nick Ingham – strings transcript and arrangement
- Allan Kelly – strings arrangement assistant
- Isobel Griffiths – orchestra contractor
- Jo Buckley – assistant orchestra contractor
- Everton Nelson – violin leader
- Steve Morris – second violin leader
- Louisa Fuller – violin
- Boguslaw Kostecki – violin
- Patrick Kiernan – violin
- Rick Koster – violin
- Tom Pigott-Smith – violin
- Julian Leaper – violin
- Ian Humphries – violin
- Simon Baggs – violin
- Clare Finnimore – viola
- Bill Hawkes – viola
- Bob Smissen – viola
- Ian Burdge – cello
- Sophie Harris – cello
- Paul Kegg – cello
- Mary Scully – bass
- Mark Stent – mixing
- Matt Green – mixing assistant
- Dan Frampton – recording and engineering
- Greg Marriot – recording and engineering assistant
- Ronan Phelan – recording and engineering assistant
- Frank Cameli – recording and engineering assistant
- Brandon Duncan – recording and engineering assistant
- Ted Jensen – mastering

== Charts ==
=== Weekly charts ===
Weekly chart performance for Science & Faith
Chart (2010–2011)	Peak position
Australian Albums (ARIA)	2
Austrian Albums (Ö3 Austria)	70
Belgian Albums (Ultratop Flanders)	47
Belgian Albums (Ultratop Wallonia)	70
Canadian Albums (Billboard)	6
Danish Albums (Hitlisten)	23
Dutch Albums (Album Top 100)	14
European Top 100 Albums (Billboard)	5
German Albums (Offizielle Top 100)	40
Irish Albums (IRMA)	1
Italian Albums (FIMI)	40
New Zealand Albums (RMNZ)	15
Scottish Albums (Official Charts)	1
Spanish Albums (Promusicae)	58
Swedish Albums (Sverigetopplistan)	52
Swiss Albums (Schweizer Hitparade)	15
UK Albums (Official Charts)	1
US Billboard 200	3
US Top Rock Albums (Billboard)	2

=== Year-end charts ===
Year-end chart performance for Science & Faith
Chart (2010)	Position
Australian Albums (ARIA)	53
European Top 100 Albums (Billboard)	78
Irish Albums (IRMA)	2
UK Albums (OCC)	19
Chart (2011)	Position
Australian Albums (ARIA)	78
Dutch Albums (Album Top 100)	84
UK Albums (OCC)	68
US Billboard 200	139
US Top Rock Albums (Billboard)	22
Chart (2012)	Position
UK Albums (OCC)	134

=== Decade-end charts ===
Decade-end chart performance for Science & Faith
Chart (2010–2019)	Position
UK Albums (OCC)	75

== Certifications and sales ==
Certifications and sales for Science & Faith
Region	Certification	Certified units/sales
Australia (ARIA)	Platinum	70,000^{^}
Ireland (IRMA)	5× Platinum	75,000^{^}
New Zealand (RMNZ)	Platinum	15,000^{‡}
United Kingdom (BPI)	2× Platinum	845,704
^{^} Shipments figures based on certification alone.^{‡} Sales+streaming figures based on certification alone.

== Release history ==
Release history and formats for Science & Faith
Region	Date	Label	Format
Ireland	10 September 2010	RCA, Sony Music	Standard
Austria	10 September 2010	RCA, Sony Music	Standard
Scandinavia	10 September 2010	RCA, Sony Music	Standard
Australia	10 September 2010	RCA, Sony Music	Standard
United Kingdom	13 September 2010	RCA, Sony Music	Standard
Germany	14 September 2010	RCA, Sony Music	Standard
United States	18 January 2011	Epic	American edition
Asia	16 October 2011	Epic	Asian tour edition (CD+DVD)
