= Danny O'Donoghue =

Irish singer (born 1980)

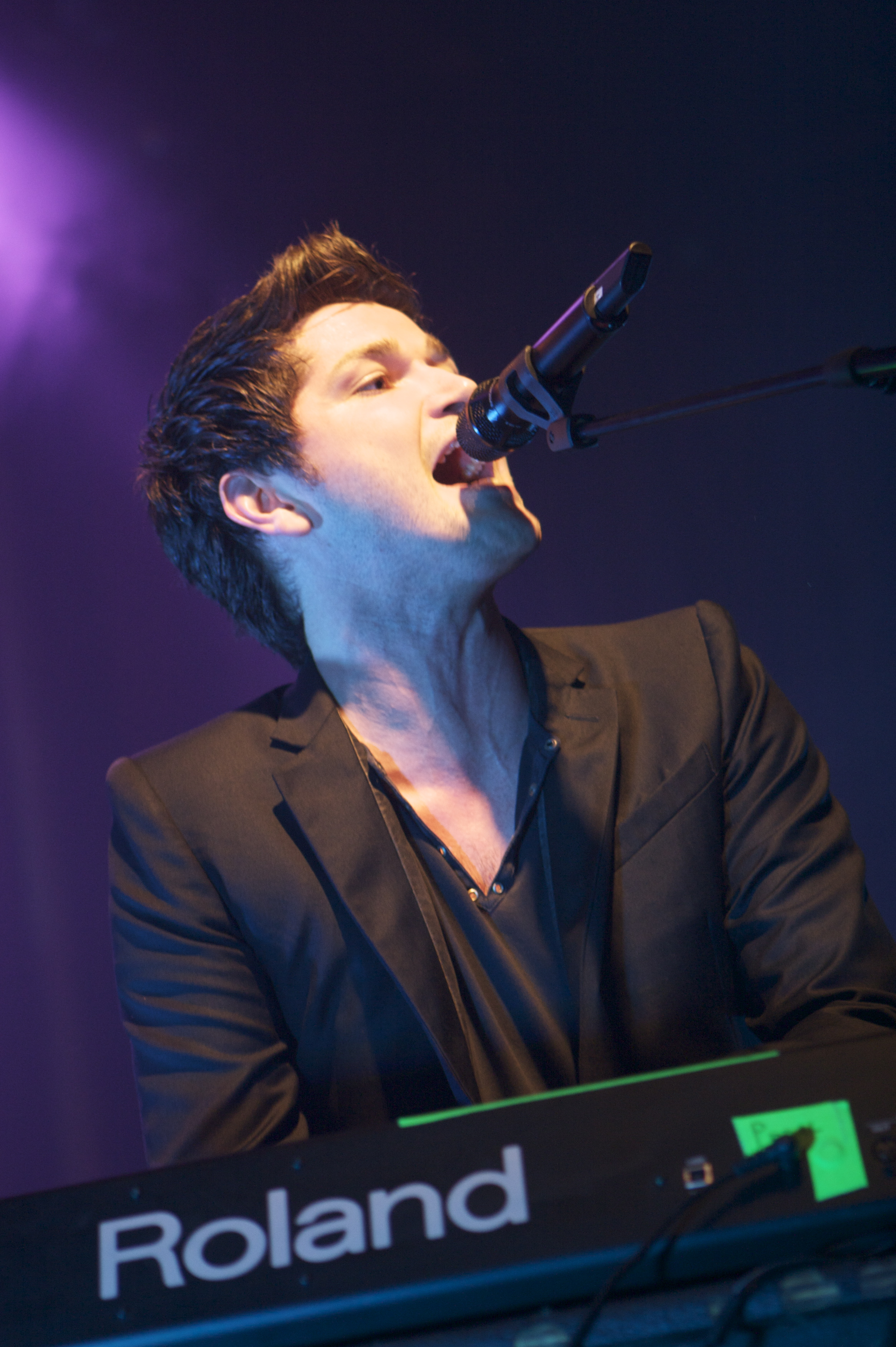
- O'Donoghue performing with the Script in 2009

Background information
- Born: Daniel John Mark Luke O'Donoghue; 3 October 1980 (age 46); Dublin, Ireland
- Occupations: Singer; songwriter; record producer; panelist
- Instruments: Vocals; keyboards; guitar
- Years active: 1996–present
- Label: Sony Music Entertainment
- Member of: The Script
- Formerly of: Mytown

Daniel John Mark Luke O'Donoghue (born 3 October 1980) is an Irish singer-songwriter and frontman of the Irish rock band the Script. He also appeared as a coach on the first two series of the television singing talent show The Voice UK. He was earlier a member of the Irish boy band Mytown.

== Early life ==
Danny O'Donoghue was born on 3 October 1980 in Dublin, Ireland, to Shay O'Donoghue, a member of the band The Dreams, and Ailish O'Donoghue. He is the youngest of six children and was raised in Ballinteer, Dublin. As a child, he was initially against the idea of being a musician; however, he ended up dropping out of school to pursue a musical career.

== Early career ==
O'Donoghue was a member of a late 1990s band Mytown with friend (and future band member of the Script) Mark Sheehan, after being signed to Universal Records in 1999. After its moderate success, O'Donoghue moved to Los Angeles with Sheehan to write songs and produce for artists such as Britney Spears, Boyz II Men and TLC.

After one year of writing, O'Donoghue and Sheehan moved back to Dublin and, recruiting drummer Glen Power, started working on their own material. They formed the band the Script in 2001.

== The Script ==
The band released their eponymous debut album on 8 August 2008. O'Donoghue co-wrote all the songs on the album. The album was a commercial success, especially in their home country, peaking at number one on the Irish Album Chart. The band has since released six more albums: Science and Faith in September 2010, #3 in September 2012, No Sound Without Silence in September 2014, Freedom Child in September 2017, and Sunsets & Full Moons in November 2019.

== The Voice UK ==
In 2012 O'Donoghue made his first appearance in The Voice UK alongside Jessie J, will.i.am and Tom Jones as a coach. The decision was supported by bandmates Glen Power and Mark Sheehan, who said: "Danny did The Voice to put a face to The Script. We know about producing, song writing and performing – we've been doing it since we were 14 or 15. Danny on a show about singing was good for us. People saw how passionate he is about music, how much it means to him and it made our band better known."

The appointment of O'Donoghue as coach initially drew criticism, with Twitter users branding him "Danny I Dunno Who" and comedian James Corden joking about it at the 2012 BRIT Awards. O'Donoghue responded saying "James who? Whatever. It's up to other people to make up their own minds. I know I'm on this show for what I've done in my career. I've spent 15 years in the music industry, it's all I know." In the first series, he coached Bo Bruce, who was the show's runner-up. He appeared as a judge for The Voice again in 2013. In the second series, Andrea Begley from his team won.

O'Donoghue co-wrote the track "Alive" for Bo Bruce's album Before I Sleep. On 16 July 2013, O'Donoghue left the show to concentrate on The Script.

== Personal life ==
O'Donoghue's father, Shay, died of stomach aneurysm on 14 February 2008, at the age of 63. The rose tattoo on O'Donoghue's left arm and the song "If You Could See Me Now" from their album #3 are dedicated to the memory of his father. His mother Ailish, died on 8 February 2019. In June 2024, O'Donoghue revealed he attends Catholic Mass daily and gave up alcohol, smoking, and caffeine.
