= Mark Sheehan =

Irish musician (1975–2023)

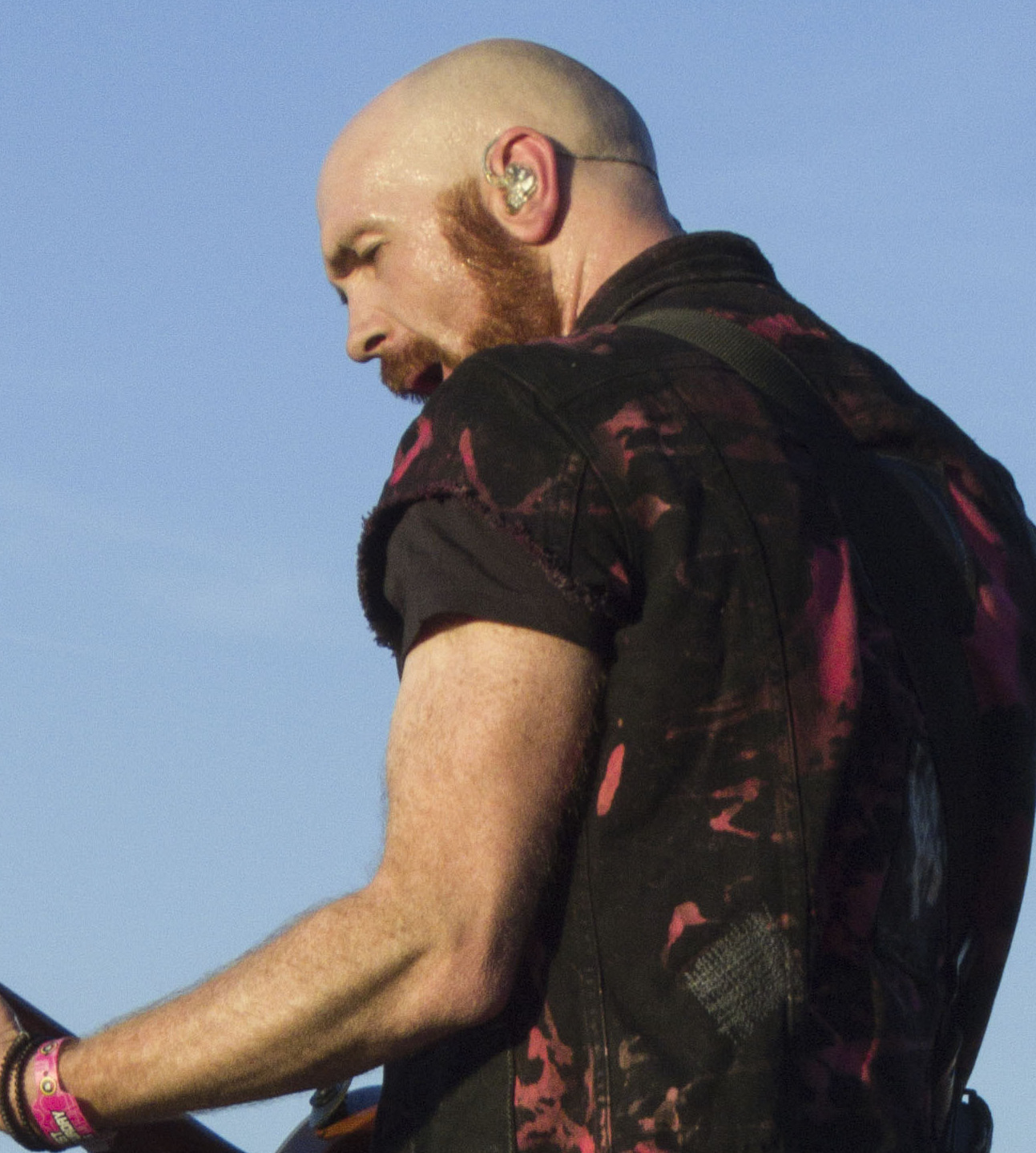
- Sheehan performing in 2015

Background information
- Born: Mark Anthony Sheehan; 29 October 1976
- Origin: The Liberties, Dublin, Ireland
- Died: 14 April 2023 (aged 46) Cuyahoga County, Ohio, USA
- Occupations: Musician; singer; composer; record producer
- Instruments: Guitar; vocals
- Years active: 1996–2023
- Label: Sony Music Entertainment
- Formerly of: Mytown; The Script
- Spouse: Rina Sheehan (m. 2005)

Mark Anthony Sheehan (29 October 1976 – 14 April 2023) was an Irish musician. From 1996 to 2001, he was a member of the boy band Mytown. In 2001, he co-founded and played lead guitar for pop rock band The Script, which he stayed in until his death in 2023.

== Early life ==
Sheehan was born in Mount Brown in The Liberties area of Dublin to Rachel and Gerald Sheehan. His father died when Sheehan was 14.

== Career ==
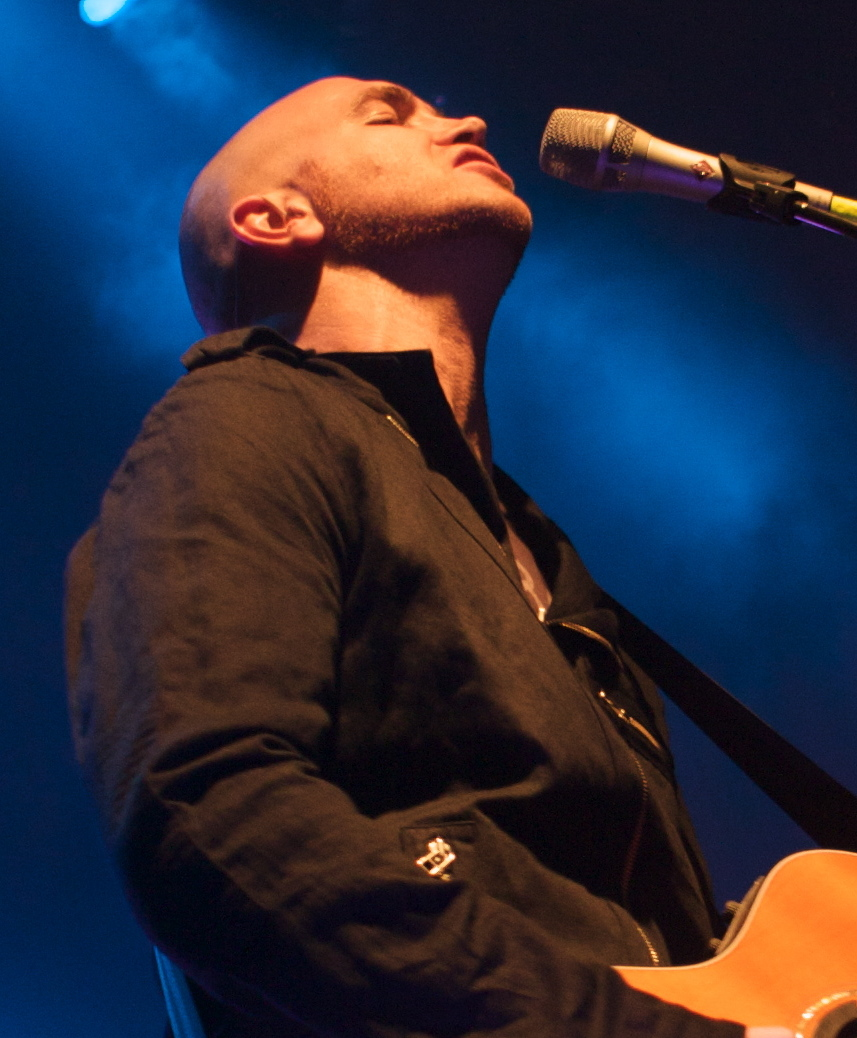
Sheehan performing with the Script in Barcelona in 2009

Sheehan began his career as a dancer. He taught hip-hop moves at Dublin's Digges Lane performing arts centre.

Sheehan was best friends with Danny O'Donoghue since the age of 12. Sheehan and O'Donoghue were members of a boy band called Mytown, which was formed in 1996. Striking up a songwriting and production partnership, they were invited to Canada to collaborate with some of their heroes. Both Sheehan and O'Donoghue were involved in the production of two tracks featured on the Peter André album The Long Road Back under the name M.A.D Notes before pursuing their own careers as musicians. They worked as producers in Los Angeles before moving back to Dublin, where they recruited drummer Glen Power to join their new band the Script. The band was formed in 2001 in Dublin.

The Script released their debut single "We Cry" on 25 April 2008. The single peaked at number 15 on the UK Singles Chart. The Script's eponymous debut album was released on 8 August 2008. The album debuted at the number one spot on the UK's album charts. The album also entered the Irish Albums Chart at number one, holding the top spot for five weeks.

The band's second single, "The Man Who Can't Be Moved", was released on 15 September 2008. The single reached number 2 in Ireland, Denmark, and the UK. The band's single "Breakeven" was released in the United States in September 2009. It reached number one on Billboard's Adult Pop chart.

The Script's next three albums, Science & Faith (2010), #3 (2012) and No Sound Without Silence (2014), all topped the album charts in Ireland and the UK, while Science & Faith reached number two in Australia and number three in the United States.

As of 2019, the band had won three Meteor Ireland Music Awards and two World Music Awards, had received two Brit Award nominations, and had sold over 20 million albums worldwide.

The band toured in 2022. Sheehan missed the U.S. leg of the tour. Danny O'Donoghue later attributed Sheehan's absence to family commitments.

== Personal life and death ==
Sheehan married Rina Sheehan in 2005.

Sheehan died on 14 April 2023 at the age of 46, following a brief, undisclosed illness.
