= No Sound Without Silence Tour =

2015 concert tour by the Script

- Tour by The Script
- Associated album: No Sound Without Silence
- Start date: 4 February 2015
- End date: 28 August 2015
- Legs: 5
- No. of shows: 3 in Africa; 7 in Asia; 42 in Europe; 6 in Australasia; 11 in North America; 69 total

The Script concert chronology
- #3 World Tour (2012–13); No Sound Without Silence Tour (2015); Freedom Child Tour (2017–18)

The No Sound Without Silence Tour is the third arena tour by Irish pop rock band The Script. Launched in support of their fourth studio album No Sound Without Silence (2014), the tour began in Tokyo on 16 January 2015 and visited Europe, North America, Asia, Africa and Oceania. The opening acts were American singer Phillip Phillips for the South African dates, and English singer Tinie Tempah for the European dates. Pharrell Williams served as a co-headliner for the Croke Park concert on 20 June 2015.

== Opening acts ==
- Colton Avery (Europe, North America, Australia, Philippines, Thailand, Malaysia)
- Mary Lambert (North America)
- Phillip Phillips (South Africa)
- Silent Sanctuary (Philippines)
- Tinie Tempah (Europe)
- Pharrell Williams (Dublin)
- The Wailers (Dublin)
- The Sam Willows (Singapore)
- Kensington (Europe)

== Setlist ==
This setlist is based on previous performances of the tour.

1. "Paint the Town Green"
2. "Hail Rain or Sunshine"
3. "Breakeven"
4. "Before the Worst"
5. "Superheroes"
6. "We Cry"
7. "If You Could See Me Now"
8. "Man on a Wire"
9. "Nothing"
10. "Good Ol' Days"
11. "Never Seen Anything (Quite Like You)"
12. "The Man Who Can't Be Moved"
13. "You Won't Feel A Thing"
14. "It's Not Right For You"
15. "Six Degrees of Separation"
16. "The Energy Never Dies"
17. "For the First Time"
18. "No Good in Goodbye"
19. "Hall of Fame"

Additional information

- During the performance in Sheffield, The Script did not perform "We Cry" due to a fan collapsing - Danny called for paramedic to check on her - she made a speedy recovery and the band were able to carry on with the rest of the show.
- During the performance in Barcelona, The Script did not perform "The End Where I Begin", "Nothing", "Six Degrees Of Separation", and "It's Not Right For You".
- During the performance in Oakland, The Script did not perform "The End Where I Begin", "We Cry", and "Six Degrees of Separation".
- During the performance in Toronto, The Script did not perform "The End Where I Begin" and "Six Degrees of Separation".
- During the performance in Hamburg, The Script did not perform "Nothing" and "Never Seen Anything (Quite Like You)".

== Tour dates ==
List of concerts, date, city, country, venue, opening acts, attendance, gross revenue
Date	City	Country	Venue	Opening acts
Africa
4 February 2015	Cape Town	South Africa	GrandWest Grand Arena	Phillip Phillips
6 February 2015	Durban	South Africa	Durban ICC Arena	Phillip Phillips
8 February 2015	Johannesburg	South Africa	Crocodile Creek Polo Club	Gangs of Ballet; Beatenberg; GoodLuck; Shortstraw
Asia
12 February 2015	Dubai	United Arab Emirates	Dubai Media City Amphitheatre	-
Europe
19 February 2015	Glasgow	Scotland	SSE Hydro	Colton Avery; Tinie Tempah
20 February 2015	Glasgow	Scotland	SSE Hydro	Colton Avery; Tinie Tempah
21 February 2015	Aberdeen	Scotland	GE Oil and Gas Arena	Colton Avery; Tinie Tempah
23 February 2015	Newcastle	England	Metro Radio Arena	Colton Avery; Tinie Tempah
24 February 2015	Leeds	England	First Direct Arena	Colton Avery; Tinie Tempah
26 February 2015	Birmingham	England	LG Arena	Colton Avery; Tinie Tempah
28 February 2015	Sheffield	England	Motorpoint Arena	Colton Avery; Tinie Tempah
2 March 2015	Cardiff	Wales	Motorpoint Arena	Colton Avery; Tinie Tempah
3 March 2015	Nottingham	England	Capital FM Arena	Colton Avery; Tinie Tempah
5 March 2015	Liverpool	England	Echo Arena	Colton Avery; Tinie Tempah
6 March 2015	Manchester	England	Manchester Arena	Colton Avery; Tinie Tempah
7 March 2015	Manchester	England	Manchester Arena	Colton Avery; Tinie Tempah
9 March 2015	Bournemouth	England	Windsor Hall	Colton Avery; Tinie Tempah
10 March 2015	Brighton	England	Brighton Centre	Colton Avery; Tinie Tempah
13 March 2015	London	England	The O_{2} Arena	Colton Avery; Tinie Tempah
14 March 2015	London	England	The O_{2} Arena	Colton Avery; Tinie Tempah
16 March 2015	Paris	France	Zénith Paris	Colton Avery; Tinie Tempah
17 March 2015	Cologne	Germany	Palladium	Colton Avery; Tinie Tempah
19 March 2015	Antwerp	Belgium	Lotto Arena	Colton Avery; Tinie Tempah
20 March 2015	Amsterdam	Netherlands	Ziggo Dome	Colton Avery; Tinie Tempah
21 March 2015	Amsterdam	Netherlands	Ziggo Dome	Colton Avery; Tinie Tempah
23 March 2015	Oslo	Norway	Oslo Spektrum	Colton Avery; Tinie Tempah
24 March 2015	Stockholm	Sweden	Annexet	Colton Avery; Tinie Tempah
26 March 2015	Munich	Germany	Zenith	-
27 March 2015	Bern	Switzerland	Festhalle Bea Expo	-
28 March 2015	Milan	Italy	Mediolanum Forum	-
30 March 2015	Barcelona	Spain	Sant Jordi Club	Labrinth
31 March 2015	Madrid	Spain	Barclaycard Center	Labrinth
1 April 2015	Lisbon	Portugal	MEO Arena	-
Asia
14 April 2015	Pasay	Philippines	Mall of Asia Arena	Silent Sanctuary
15 April 2015	Seoul	South Korea	Olympic Hall	-
19 April 2015	Kuala Lumpur	Malaysia	Putra Indoor Stadium	Colton Avery
21 April 2015	Singapore		Singapore Indoor Stadium	The Sam Willows
Australasia
24 April 2015	Perth	Australia	Perth Arena	Labrinth
27 April 2015	Adelaide	Australia	Adelaide Entertainment Centre	Labrinth
29 April 2015	Melbourne	Australia	Rod Laver Arena	Labrinth
1 May 2015	Sydney	Australia	Allphones Arena	Labrinth
2 May 2015	Brisbane	Australia	Brisbane Entertainment Centre	Labrinth
5 May 2015	Auckland	New Zealand	Vector Arena	Labrinth
Asia
8 May 2015	Bangkok	Thailand	Impact Arena	Colton Avery
North America
26 May 2015	Boston	United States	House of Blues	Colton Avery; Mary Lambert
27 May 2015	Philadelphia	United States	Electric Factory	Colton Avery; Mary Lambert
28 May 2015	Toronto	Canada	Massey Hall	Colton Avery; Mary Lambert
30 May 2015	Las Vegas	United States	Mandalay Bay Beach	Colton Avery; Mary Lambert
31 May 2015	Oakland	United States	Fox Oakland Theatre	Colton Avery; Mary Lambert
2 June 2015	Los Angeles	United States	Wiltern Theatre	Colton Avery; Mary Lambert
3 June 2015	Tempe	United States	Marquee Theatre	Colton Avery; Mary Lambert
5 June 2015	Minneapolis	United States	State Theatre	Colton Avery; Mary Lambert
6 June 2015	Chicago	United States	Riviera Theatre	Colton Avery; Mary Lambert
7 June 2015	St. Louis	United States	The Pageant	Colton Avery; Mary Lambert
10 June 2015	Mexico City	Mexico	Palacio de los Deportes	Colton Avery; Mary Lambert
Europe
13 June 2015	Landgraaf	Netherlands	Megaland	-
14 June 2015	Esch-sur-Alzette	Luxembourg	Rockhal	-
20 June 2015	Dublin	Ireland	Croke Park	Pharrell Williams (Note: Co-headliner)
28 June 2015	Werchter	Belgium	Werchter Festival Grounds	-
2 July 2015	Brandon	England	Thetford Forest	-
3 July 2015	Arras	France	Citadelle d'Arras	-
9 July 2015	Lucca	Italy	Piazza Napoleone	-
11 July 2015	Auchterarder	Scotland	Strathallan Castle	-
Asia
14 July 2015	Byblos	Lebanon	Byblos Festival Stage	-
Europe
18 July 2015	Vila Nova de Gaia	Portugal	Palco Meo	-
21 July 2015	Nyon	Switzerland	Plaine de l'Asse	-
25 August 2015	Zürich	Switzerland	Komplex 457	-
27 August 2015	Bochum	Germany	Kemnader See	-
28 August 2015	Frankfurt	Germany	Jahrhunderthalle	-
