= 3 World Tour =

2012–13 concert tour by the Script

#3 World Tour
- World tour by The Script
- Promotional poster for the tour
- Associated album: #3
- Start date: 5 September 2012
- End date: 14 July 2013
- Legs: 8
- No. of shows: 46 in Europe; 20 in North America; 6 in Australia; 5 in Asia; 78 in total

The Script concert chronology
- Science & Faith Tour (2010–11); #3 World Tour (2012–13); No Sound Without Silence Tour (2015)

#3 World Tour is the second concert tour by Irish alternative rock band the Script. Launched in support of their third studio album #3 (2012), the tour began in Ireland with two intimate shows in Cork and Dublin.

== Itinerary ==
The world tour started in Ireland with two intimate shows in Cork and Dublin which took place in September, thus kicking off the tour. These shows were only announced three days before the shows took place and were only available from one Ticketmaster outlet in each city. They also performed three intimate club shows in Glasgow, Manchester and London. They performed one show in Sydney to showcase new material from #3 as well as tracks from previous albums. The North American leg began in New York City on 9 October with a further 18 shows across the United States and Canada. On 18 September, A twelve date arena tour of Ireland and the United Kingdom was announced for March 2013. Before returning to Australia, the band performed in South Korea, at Seoul's AX Hall. The band then returned to Australia to perform their biggest tour yet down under with four shows across the country. The final show of the tour was on 12 April at the Vector Arena in Auckland New Zealand marking the band's first concert there and the closure of the official #3 world tour. Over the summer of 2013 they continued to promote their album at several summer music festivals, as well as playing as the opening act for Train.

== Support Acts ==
- Sinéad Burgess (Sydney, Metro Theatre)
- Tristan Prettyman (North America, select dates)
- The Original Rudeboys (Europe, 21 January—2 February, Ireland, select dates & United Kingdom, Australia)
- Hudson Taylor (Ireland, select dates)
- Brooke Duff (New Zealand, 12 April 2013)

== Setlist ==
1. "Good Ol' Days"
2. "We Cry"
3. "Breakeven"
4. "Science & Faith"
5. "The Man Who Can't Be Moved"
6. "If You Could See Me Now"
7. "Before The Worst"
8. "If You Ever Come Back"
9. "Talk You Down"
10. "Nothing"
11. "I'm Yours"
12. "Six Degrees of Separation"
13. "For The First Time"

Encore

1. "You Won't Feel A Thing"
2. "Hall of Fame"

== Tour dates ==
Date	City	Country	Venue
Europe
5 September 2012	Cork	Ireland	Cork Opera House
6 September 2012	Dublin	Ireland	The Academy
9 September 2012	Glasgow	United Kingdom	O_{2} ABC Glasgow
10 September 2012	Manchester	United Kingdom	HMV Ritz
12 September 2012	London	United Kingdom	O_{2} Shepherd's Bush Empire
Australia
24 September 2012	Sydney	Australia	The Metro Theatre
North America
9 October 2012	New York City	United States	Radio City Music Hall
18 October 2012	Oakland	United States	Fox Oakland Theatre
19 October 2012	San Diego	United States	Humphreys Concerts by the Bay
20 October 2012	Los Angeles	United States	Greek Theatre
22 October 2012	Salt Lake City	United States	Rail Event Center
23 October 2012	Denver	United States	Ogden Theatre
25 October 2012	St. Louis	United States	Peabody Opera House
26 October 2012	Minneapolis	United States	Orpheum Theatre
27 October 2012	Chicago	United States	Aragon Ballroom
29 October 2012	Dallas	United States	House of Blues
30 October 2012	Houston	United States	Bayou Music Center
1 November 2012	Hollywood	United States	Hard Rock Live
2 November 2012	Boca Raton	United States	Mizner Park Amphitheatre
3 November 2012	Atlanta	United States	The Tabernacle
6 November 2012	Toronto	Canada	Sony Centre for the Performing Arts
7 November 2012	Washington, D.C.	United States	DAR Constitution Hall
9 November 2012	Boston	United States	Agganis Arena
10 November 2012	Camden	United States	Susquehanna Bank Center
2 December 2012^{[A]}	Las Vegas	United States	The Joint
5 December 2012	Huntington	United States	Huntington Paramount Theatre
Europe
8 December 2012^{[B]}	London	United Kingdom	The O_{2} Arena
21 January 2013	Hamburg	Germany	Große Freiheit 36
22 January 2013	Berlin	Germany	Huxleys Neue Welt
23 January 2013	Munich	Germany	Kesselhaus
25 January 2013	Amsterdam	Netherlands	Ziggo Dome
26 January 2013	Brussels	Belgium	Forest National
28 January 2013	Paris	France	L'Olympia
29 January 2013	Milan	Italy	Discoteca Alcatraz Milano
30 January 2013	Zürich	Switzerland	Volkshaus
1 February 2013	Madrid	Spain	Palacio Vistalegre
2 February 2013	Lisbon	Portugal	Campo Pequeno
Asia
22 February 2013^{[C]}	Dubai	United Arab Emirates	Dubai Festival City Concert Area
Europe
28 February 2013	Dublin	Ireland	The O_{2}
1 March 2013	Dublin	Ireland	The O_{2}
2 March 2013	Dublin	Ireland	The O_{2}
4 March 2013	Belfast	United Kingdom	Odyssey Arena
5 March 2013	Belfast	United Kingdom	Odyssey Arena
6 March 2013	Belfast	United Kingdom	Odyssey Arena
8 March 2013	Nottingham	United Kingdom	Capital FM Arena Nottingham
9 March 2013	Liverpool	United Kingdom	Echo Arena Liverpool
10 March 2013	Newcastle	United Kingdom	Metro Radio Arena
12 March 2013	Glasgow	United Kingdom	Scottish Exhibition and Conference Centre
13 March 2013	Aberdeen	United Kingdom	Press & Journal Arena
15 March 2013	Sheffield	United Kingdom	Motorpoint Arena Sheffield
16 March 2013	Birmingham	United Kingdom	LG Arena
17 March 2013	Manchester	United Kingdom	Manchester Arena
19 March 2013	Cardiff	United Kingdom	Motorpoint Arena Cardiff
20 March 2013	Brighton	United Kingdom	Brighton Centre
22 March 2013	London	United Kingdom	The O_{2} Arena
23 March 2013	London	United Kingdom	The O_{2} Arena
Asia
27 March 2013	Seoul	South Korea	Uniqlo-AX Hall
29 March 2013	Singapore		Singapore Indoor Stadium
31 March 2013	Quezon City	Philippines	Smart Araneta Coliseum
Australasia
3 April 2013	Perth	Australia	Perth Arena
6 April 2013	Melbourne	Australia	Rod Laver Arena
7 April 2013	Sydney	Australia	Sydney Entertainment Centre
9 April 2013	Brisbane	Australia	Brisbane Entertainment Centre
12 April 2013	Auckland	New Zealand	Vector Arena
Asia
9 May 2013	Doha	Qatar	National Convention Centre
Europe
26 May 2013^{[K]}	Derry	United Kingdom	Ebrington Square
14 June 2013	Landgraaf	Netherlands	Megaland Landgraaf
16 June 2013^{[D]}	Newport	United Kingdom	Seaclose Park
27 June 2013^{[H]}	Borlänge	Sweden	Borlänge Festival Grounds
28 June 2013^{[E]}	Thisted	Denmark	Dyreskuepladsen
29 June 2013^{[I]}	Roeser	Luxembourg	Herchesfeld
3 July 2013^{[J]}	Arendal	Norway	Tromøya
5 July 2013^{[G]}	Werchter	Belgium	Werchter Festival Grounds
11 July 2013	Thetford	United Kingdom	Thetford Forest
12 July 2013	Bridlington	United Kingdom	The Spa
14 July 2013^{[F]}	Balado	United Kingdom	Balado Airfield
17 August 2013^{[L]}	Chelmsford	United Kingdom	Hylands Park
18 August 2013^{[L]}	Staffordshire	United Kingdom	Weston Park
29 August 2013^{[M]}	Leeds (cancelled)	United Kingdom	O2 Academy
30 August 2013^{[M]}	Blackpool (cancelled)	United Kingdom	Blackpool Illuminations 2013

=== Box office score data ===
Venue	City	Tickets sold / available	Gross revenue
Fox Theatre	Oakland	1,796 / 2,800 (64%)	$67,408
Greek Theatre	Los Angeles	4,071 / 4,361 (93%)	$123,888
Aragon Ballroom	Chicago	2,031 / 4,873 (47%)	$65,192
Manchester Arena	Manchester	16,863 / 17,145 (98%)	$741,564
Entertainment Centre	Brisbane	7,612 / 8,184 (93%)	$634,461

Cancellations and rescheduled shows

25 January 2013	Amsterdam, Netherlands	Heineken Music Hall	Moved to Ziggo Dome
29 August 2013	Leeds, UK	O2 Academy	cancelled due to family illness
30 August 2013	Blackpool, UK	Blackpool Illuminations 2013	cancelled due to family illness

Festivals and other miscellaneous performances
^{A} This show was part of Mark & Mercedes Not So Silent Night.
^{B} This show was part of Capital FM Jingle Bell Ball.
^{C} This show is part of the Dubai International Jazz Festival.
^{D} This show is part of the Isle of Wight Festival.
^{E} This show is part of the Thy Rock Festival.
^{F} This show is part of T in the Park.
^{G} This show is part of Rock Werchter.
^{H} This show is part of the Peace & Love Festival.
^{I} This show is part of the Rock-A-Field Festival.
^{J} This show is part of the Hove Festival.
^{K} This show is part of Radio 1's Big Weekend.
^{L} These shows are part of the V Festival.
^{M} Leeds and Blackpool shows were cancelled due to family illness.
