= Ziggo Dome =

Multi-use indoor arena in Amsterdam

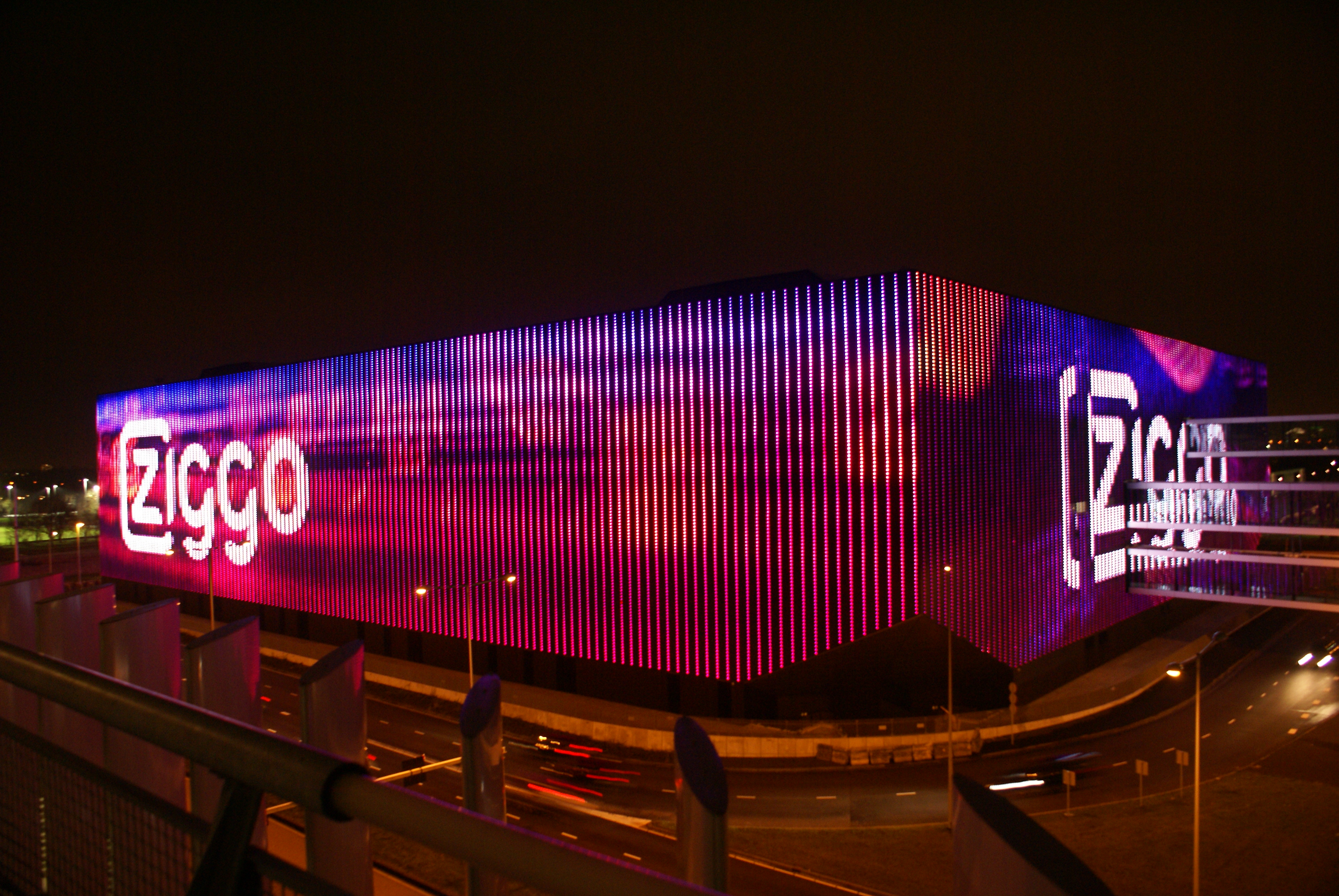
- Exterior of venue (2013)
- Interactive map of Ziggo Dome
- Address: De Passage 100; 1101 AX Amsterdam; Netherlands
- Location: Bijlmermeer
- Coordinates: 52°18′48″N 4°56′13″E
- Owner: Black Box Real Estate
- Capacity: 17,000
- Public transit: Bijlmer ArenA station

Construction
- Built: 2009–2012
- Opened: 24 June 2012
- Architect: Benthem Crouwel Architekten

The Ziggo Dome (Dutch pronunciation: [ˈzɪɡoː doːm] or [ˈzɪɣoː doːm]) is an indoor arena in Amsterdam, Netherlands, located next to the Johan Cruijff Arena. It is named after the Dutch cable TV provider Ziggo. With a capacity of 17,000 people, it is the largest indoor concert venue in the Netherlands.

== Architecture ==
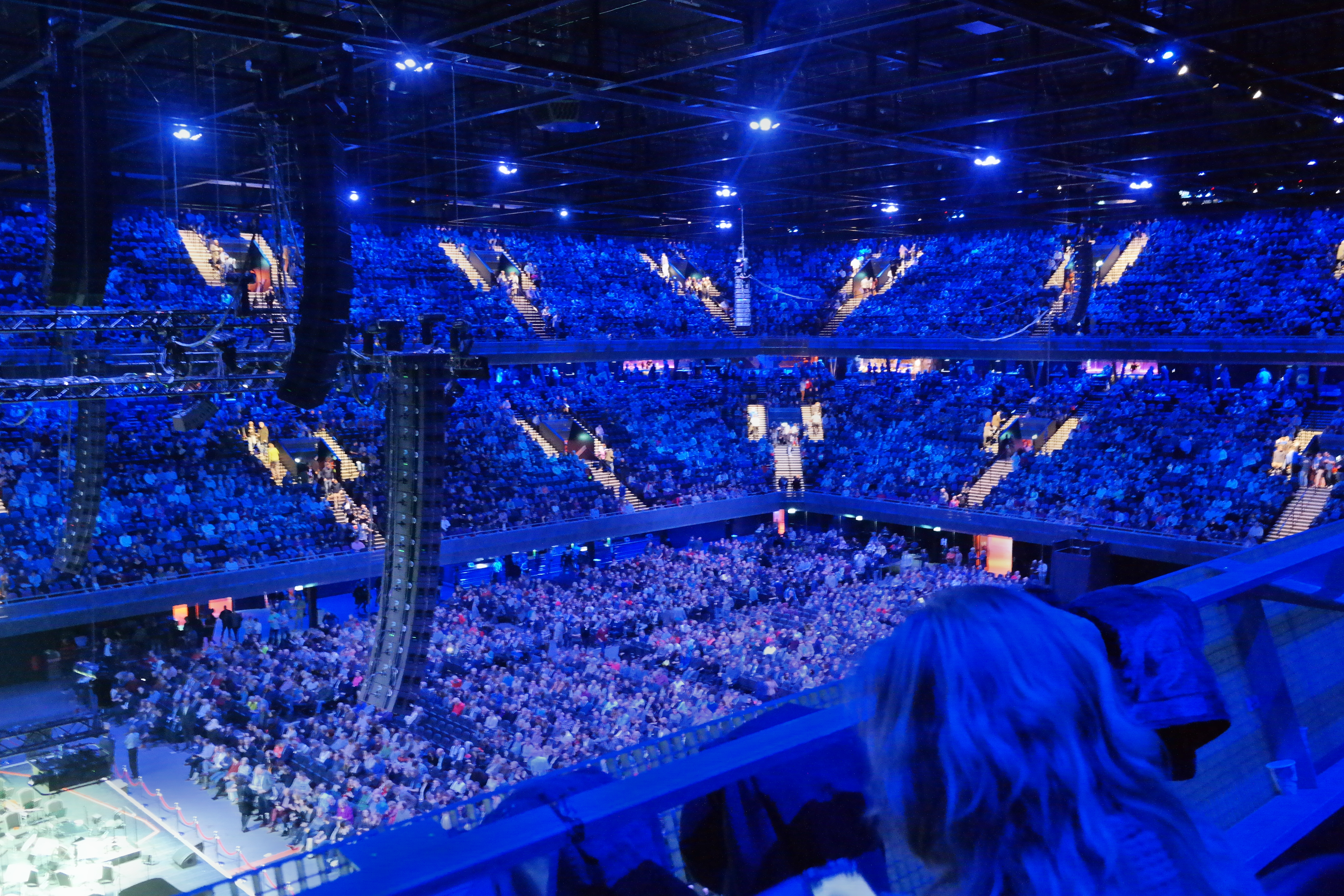
Arena bowl (2015)

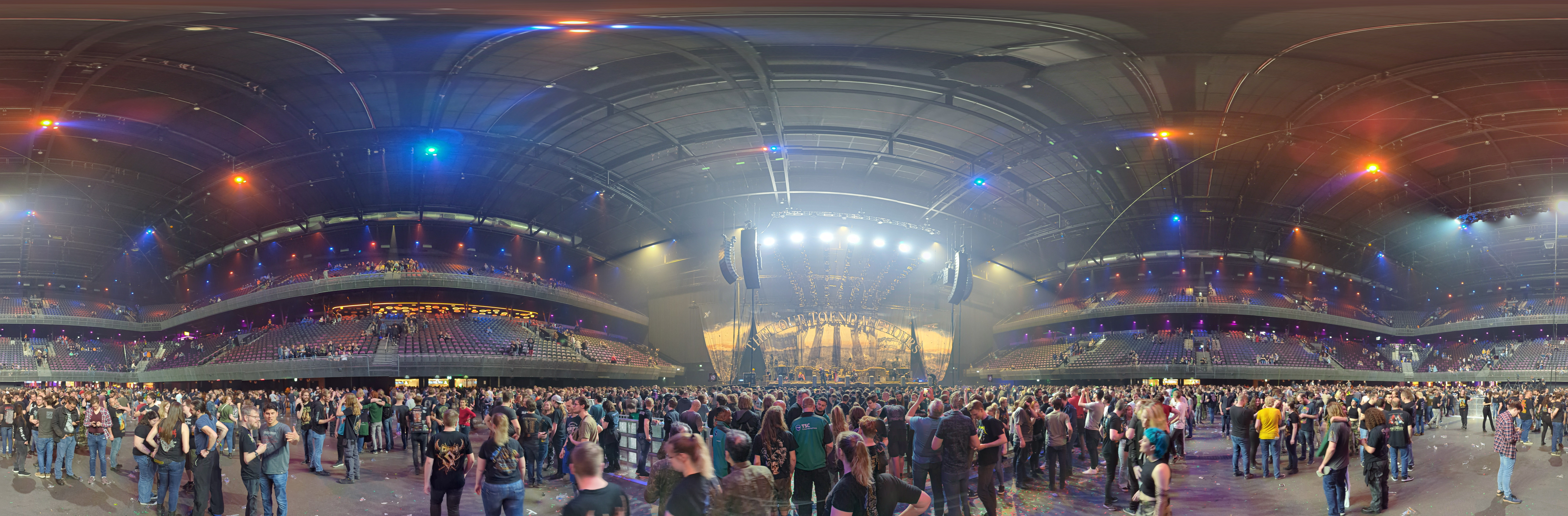
360-degree photosphere of the arena just after a concert (2023)

The Ziggo Dome was designed by Benthem Crouwel Architects. Although the name 'Dome' refers to a dome, there are no round shapes. The building has the shape of a square block; the size is 90 by 90 meters, with a height of 30 meters. On the outside, the Ziggo Dome, on a black background, is fully lined with a total of 840,000 LEDs, where video images can be displayed.

The building is designed for amplified music, but is multi-usable and can also be made suitable for tennis and korfball competitions, an Olympic-size swimming pool or an ice rink with minimal adjustments.

== Notable events ==
The Ziggo Dome has been heavily used for concerts; as of 2017, it ranks behind Madison Square Garden, SSE Hydro, Manchester Arena, and the O2 Arena as the 5th busiest concert venue in the world.

The first concert was held on 24 June 2012 by Dutch singer Marco Borsato. The first international act to play the Ziggo Dome was Pearl Jam on 26 June 2012.

In 2014, the Ziggo Dome Awards were announced, recognizing artists who performed at the arena.

From 2016, the final of the Korfbal League, the highest Korfball league in the Netherlands, will take place in the Ziggo Dome until 2019. This was announced by the Dutch governing body of korfball KNKV in July 2015. Previously, the event was held for over 30 years in Rotterdam Ahoy.

On 18 May 2018, and 12 November 2019, American professional wrestling promotion WWE held two house shows at the Ziggo Dome, of which the first being a SmackDown Live house show.

The Ziggo Dome were one of the two venues that were part of the 2022 UEFA Futsal Championship where Group Stage and Knockout Futsal matches took place between 19 January to 6 February 2022.

Porcupine Tree's reunion tour show at the Ziggo Dome on 7 November 2022 was released as a live album, Closure/Continuation.Live, on 8 December 2023.

=== Concerts ===
Entertainment events held at the Ziggo Dome
| Year | Date | Nationality | Artists | Tour | Supporting Acts | Attendance | Box Office |
2012
| 2012 | 24 June | Netherlands | Marco Borsato | Dichtbij On Tour | —N/a | —N/a | |
| 2012 | 26 June | United States | Pearl Jam | Pearl Jam 2012 Tour | X | —N/a | |
| 2012 | 27 June | United States | Pearl Jam | Pearl Jam 2012 Tour | X | —N/a | |
| 2012 | 7 July | United States | Madonna | MDNA Tour | Martin Solveig | 29,172 / 29,172 | $3,777,245 |
| 2012 | 8 July | United States | Madonna | MDNA Tour | Martin Solveig | 29,172 / 29,172 | $3,777,245 |
| 2012 | 17 September | United States | Lady Gaga | Born This Way Ball Tour | The Darkness; Lady Starlight | 26,375 / 26,375 | $2,462,977 |
| 2012 | 18 September | United States | Lady Gaga | Born This Way Ball Tour | The Darkness; Lady Starlight | 26,375 / 26,375 | $2,462,977 |
| 2012 | 6 December | United States | Chris Brown | Carpe Diem Tour | —N/a | —N/a | |
| 2012 | 7 December | Sweden | Swedish House Mafia | One Last Tour | —N/a | —N/a | |
| 2012 | 12 December | Sweden | Swedish House Mafia | One Last Tour | —N/a | —N/a | |
| 2012 | 13 December | Sweden | Swedish House Mafia | One Last Tour | —N/a | —N/a | |
| 2012 | 17 December | United Kingdom | Muse | The 2nd Law World Tour | Andy Burrows | 17,000 | $1,360,000 |
2013
| 2013 | 8 March | Canada | Cirque du Soleil | Michael Jackson: The Immortal World Tour | —N/a | 26,744 / 30,588 | $2,691,260 |
| 2013 | 9 March | Canada | Cirque du Soleil | Michael Jackson: The Immortal World Tour | —N/a | 26,744 / 30,588 | $2,691,260 |
| 2013 | 10 March | Canada | Cirque du Soleil | Michael Jackson: The Immortal World Tour | —N/a | 26,744 / 30,588 | $2,691,260 |
| 2013 | 19 April | United States | Pink | Truth About Love Tour | Walk the Moon | 16,771 / 16,771 | $1,174,110 |
| 2013 | 21 April | United States | Beyoncé | Mrs. Carter Show World Tour | Eva Simons | 30,897 / 31,600 | $2,559,806 |
| 2013 | 22 April | United States | Beyoncé | Mrs. Carter Show World Tour | Eva Simons | 30,897 / 31,600 | $2,559,806 |
| 2013 | 3 May | United Kingdom | One Direction | Take Me Home Tour | Camryn | —N/a | |
| 2013 | 9 June | United States | Josh Groban | All That Echoes World Tour | —N/a | —N/a | |
| 2013 | 12 June | United Kingdom | Rod Stewart | Live the Life Tour | —N/a | 12,099 / 12,099 | $833,468 |
| 2013 | 23 June | Barbados | Rihanna | Diamonds World Tour | GTA | 33,369 / 33,369 | $2,354,542 |
| 2013 | 24 June | Barbados | Rihanna | Diamonds World Tour | GTA | 33,369 / 33,369 | $2,354,542 |
| 2013 | 25 June | United Kingdom | Iron Maiden | Maiden England World Tour | —N/a | —N/a | |
| 2013 | 15 October | United States | Bruno Mars | Moonshine Jungle Tour | Mayer Hawthorne | —N/a | |
| 2013 | 22 October | United States | John Mayer | Born and Raised World Tour | Phillip Phillips | —N/a | |
| 2013 | 29 October | United States | Jay Z | Magna Carter World Tour | —N/a | —N/a | |
| 2013 | 10 November | —N/a | MTV EMAs | 20th Annual MTV Europe Music Awards | | —N/a | |
| 2013 | 15 November | Netherlands | Armin van Buuren | Armin Only Intense World Tour | —N/a | —N/a | |
| 2013 | 16 November | Netherlands | Armin van Buuren | Armin Only Intense World Tour | —N/a | —N/a | |
| 2013 | 7 December | United Kingdom | Depeche Mode | Delta Machine Tour | —N/a | 16,750 / 16,750 | $1,453,121 |
2014
| 2014 | 18 March | United States | Beyoncé | Mrs. Carter Show World Tour | Monsieur Adi | 31,353 / 31,353 | $2,912,550 |
| 2014 | 19 March | United States | Beyoncé | Mrs. Carter Show World Tour | Monsieur Adi | 31,353 / 31,353 | $2,912,550 |
| 2014 | 28 April | United States | Justin Timberlake | The 20/20 Experience World Tour | DJ Freestyle | 15,383 / 15,383 | $1,624,794 |
| 2014 | 20 June | United States | John Mayer | Born and Raised World Tour | Go Back to the Zoo | —N/a | |
| 2014 | 22 June | United States | Miley Cyrus | Bangerz Tour | —N/a | 12,617 / 14,088 | $1,856,860 |
| 2014 | 24 September | United States | Lady Gaga | ArtRave: The Artpop Ball | Lady Starlight | 14,196 / 14,196 | $2,273,725 |
| 2014 | 18 November | Spain | Enrique Iglesias | Sex and Love Tour | Demi Lovato | 15,352 / 15,352 | $1,670,973 |
| 2014 | 5 December | Netherlands | Armin van Buuren | Armin Only Intense World Tour | —N/a | —N/a | |
| 2014 | 6 December | Netherlands | Armin van Buuren | Armin Only Intense World Tour | —N/a | —N/a | |
2015
| 2015 | 9 March | United States | Katy Perry | Prismatic World Tour | Charli XCX | —N/a | |
| 2015 | 10 March | United States | Katy Perry | Prismatic World Tour | Charli XCX | —N/a | |
| 2015 | 19 March | Trinidad & Tobago | Nicki Minaj | Pinkprint Tour | Trey Songz; Ester Dean | 15,497 / 21,600 | $1,574,435 |
| 2015 | 20 March | Ireland | The Script | No Sound Without Silence Tour | Colton Avery; Tinie Tempah | —N/a | |
| 2015 | 21 March | Ireland | The Script | No Sound Without Silence Tour | Colton Avery; Tinie Tempah | —N/a | |
| 2015 | 20 May | Australia | 5 Seconds of Summer | Rock Out with Your Socks Out Tour | Hey Violet | 11,861 / 11,861 | $495,137 |
| 2015 | 28 May | United States | Ariana Grande | The Honeymoon Tour | Rixton | 29,719 / 29,719 | $1,859,574 |
| 2015 | 29 May | United States | Ariana Grande | The Honeymoon Tour | Rixton | 29,719 / 29,719 | $1,859,574 |
| 2015 | 30 May | United States | Toto | Toto XIV Tour | —N/a | 14,000 | —N/a |
| 2015 | 3 June | United States | Maroon 5 | Maroon V Tour | Magic! Nick Gardner | 16,763 / 16,763 | $818,801 |
| 2015 | 18 June | United States | Kiss | The KISS 40th Anniversary World Tour | The Dead Daisies | 16,763 / 16,763 | —N/a |
| 2015 | 21 June | United States | Taylor Swift | The 1989 World Tour | James Bay | 11,166 / 11,166 (100%) | $1,800,829 |
| 2015 | 8 September | Ireland | U2 | Innocence + Experience Tour | —N/a | 68,463 / 68,463 | $7,674,824 |
| 2015 | 9 September | Ireland | U2 | Innocence + Experience Tour | —N/a | 68,463 / 68,463 | $7,674,824 |
| 2015 | 12 September | Ireland | U2 | Innocence + Experience Tour | —N/a | 68,463 / 68,463 | $7,674,824 |
| 2015 | 13 September | Ireland | U2 | Innocence + Experience Tour | —N/a | 68,463 / 68,463 | $7,674,824 |
| 2015 | 7 October | United Kingdom | Take That | 2015 Live Tour | —N/a | —N/a | |
| 2015 | 3 November | Italy | Eros Ramazzotti | | —N/a | —N/a | |
| 2015 | 20 November | United Kingdom | Simply Red | Big Love Tour | —N/a | —N/a | |
| 2015 | 21 November | United Kingdom | Simply Red | Big Love Tour | —N/a | —N/a | |
| 2015 | 25 November | Netherlands | Kensington | —N/a | Orange Skyline | —N/a | |
| 2015 | 26 November | Netherlands | Kensington | —N/a | Orange Skyline | —N/a | |
| 2015 | 5 December | United States | Madonna | Rebel Heart Tour | Lunice | 30,023 / 30,023 | $3,559,122 |
| 2015 | 6 December | United States | Madonna | Rebel Heart Tour | Lunice | 30,023 / 30,023 | $3,559,122 |
| 2015 | 10 December | United Kingdom | Florence + The Machine | How Big How Blue How Beautiful Tour | —N/a | —N/a | |
2016
| 2016 | 26 January | United Kingdom | Ellie Goulding | Delirium World Tour | Sarah Hartman | 14,332 / 14,332 | —N/a |
| 2016 | 5 February | United States | Imagine Dragons | Smoke + Mirrors Tour | —N/a | —N/a | |
| 2016 | 7 March | United Kingdom | Muse | Drones World Tour | Nothing But Thieves | —N/a | |
| 2016 | 9 March | United Kingdom | Muse | Drones World Tour | Nothing But Thieves | —N/a | |
| 2016 | 10 March | United Kingdom | Muse | Drones World Tour | Nothing But Thieves | —N/a | |
| 2016 | 22 March | United States; United Kingdom | Paul Simon; Sting | On Stage Together | —N/a | —N/a | |
| 2016 | 23 April | United States | Mariah Carey | Sweet Sweet Fantasy Tour | —N/a | —N/a | |
| 2016 | 14 May | United Kingdom | Rod Stewart | Hits 2016 | —N/a | 11,857 / 11,857 | $939,239 |
| 2016 | 21 May | Australia | 5 Seconds of Summer | Sounds Live Feels Live World Tour | Don Broco | 16,921 / 18,958 | $812,440 |
| 2016 | 22 May | Australia | 5 Seconds of Summer | Sounds Live Feels Live World Tour | Don Broco | 16,921 / 18,958 | $812,440 |
| 2016 | 1 June | United Kingdom | Adele | Adele Live 2016 | —N/a | 51,777 / 51,777 | $4,810,120 |
| 2016 | 3 June | United Kingdom | Adele | Adele Live 2016 | —N/a | 51,777 / 51,777 | $4,810,120 |
| 2016 | 4 June | United Kingdom | Adele | Adele Live 2016 | —N/a | 51,777 / 51,777 | $4,810,120 |
| 2016 | 6 June | United Kingdom | Adele | Adele Live 2016 | —N/a | 51,777 / 51,777 | $4,810,120 |
| 2016 | 11 June | United States | Chris Brown | One Hell Of a Nite Tour | —N/a | —N/a | |
| 2016 | 15 June | Netherlands | Doe Maar | —N/a | —N/a | —N/a | |
| 2016 | 16 June | Netherlands | Doe Maar | —N/a | —N/a | —N/a | |
| 2016 | 18 June | Netherlands | Doe Maar | —N/a | —N/a | —N/a | |
| 2016 | 9 July | Canada | Neil Young | Rebel Content Tour | —N/a | —N/a | |
| 2016 | 5 September | Netherlands | Jostiband Orchestra | 50th anniversary Show | —N/a | —N/a | |
| 2016 | 24 September | United Kingdom | Above & Beyond | Group Therapy (ABGT) 200 | Andrew Bayer & Ilan Bluestone; Cubicolor; Grum; Jason Ross; Yotto | —N/a | |
| 2016 | 8 November | United States | Red Hot Chili Peppers | The Getaway World Tour | Deerhoof | —N/a | |
| 2016 | 9 November | United States | Red Hot Chili Peppers | The Getaway World Tour | Deerhoof | —N/a | |
| 2016 | 10 November | Netherlands | Kensington | —N/a | Pauw; Indian Askin; The Great Communicators | —N/a | |
| 2016 | 11 November | Netherlands | Kensington | —N/a | Pauw; Indian Askin; The Great Communicators | —N/a | |
| 2016 | 12 November | Netherlands | Kensington | —N/a | Pauw; Indian Askin; The Great Communicators | —N/a | |
| 2016 | 22 November | United Kingdom | Elton John | Wonderful Crazy Night Tour | —N/a | —N/a | |
2017
| 2017 | 4 February | Netherlands | Hessel | Hessel & Tess – Live in Ziggo Dome | Tess | —N/a | |
| 2017 | 18 February | United States | Avenged Sevenfold | The Stage World Tour | Disturbed | | |
| 2017 | 24 February | Canada | The Weeknd | Starboy: Legend of the Fall Tour | —N/a | | |
| 2017 | 3 April | United Kingdom | Ed Sheeran | ÷ Tour | Anne-Marie; Ryan McMullan | 33,255 / 33,255 | $2,115,870 |
| 2017 | 4 April | United Kingdom | Ed Sheeran | ÷ Tour | Anne-Marie; Ryan McMullan | 33,255 / 33,255 | $2,115,870 |
| 2017 | 29 April | United States | Joe Bonamassa | The guitar event of the year | —N/a | —N/a | |
| 2017 | 1 May | Canada | Shawn Mendes | Illuminate World Tour | James TW | 12,376 / 12,376 | $568,762 |
| 2017 | 2 May | United States | John Mayer | The Search for Everything World Tour | Andreas Moe | 33,176 / 33,176 | $1,793,553 |
| 2017 | 3 May | United States | John Mayer | The Search for Everything World Tour | Andreas Moe | 33,176 / 33,176 | $1,793,553 |
| 2017 | 7 May | United Kingdom | Depeche Mode | Global Spirit Tour | The Raveonettes | 16,431 / 16,431 | $1,351,102 |
| 2017 | 9 May | United States | Bruno Mars | 24K Magic World Tour | Anderson Paak | 34,320 / 34,320 | $2,568,374 |
| 2017 | 10 May | United States | Bruno Mars | 24K Magic World Tour | Anderson Paak | 34,320 / 34,320 | $2,568,374 |
| 2017 | 14 May | United States | Ariana Grande | Dangerous Woman Tour | Bia; Victoria Monét | 31,801 / 31,815 | $1,638,610 |
| 2017 | 16 May | United States | Ariana Grande | Dangerous Woman Tour | Bia; Victoria Monét | 31,801 / 31,815 | $1,638,610 |
| 2017 | 24 May | Netherlands | Anouk | —N/a | —N/a | —N/a | |
| 2017 | 27 May | Netherlands | Anouk | —N/a | —N/a | —N/a | |
| 2017 | 31 May | Netherlands | Anouk | —N/a | —N/a | —N/a | |
| 2017 | 2 June | United Kingdom | Deep Purple | InFinite – The Long Goodbye Tour | —N/a | —N/a | |
| 2017 | 4 September | United States | Metallica | WorldWired Tour | Kvelertak | —N/a | |
| 2017 | 6 September | United States | Metallica | WorldWired Tour | Kvelertak | —N/a | |
| 2017 | 28 September | South Korea | G-Dragon | Act III: M.O.T.T.E World Tour | —N/a | —N/a | |
| 2017 | 5 October | United States | J. Cole | 4 Your Eyez Only World Tour | Ari Lennox; JID | —N/a | |
| 2017 | 12 November | United States | Queens of the Stone Age | Villains World Tour | —N/a | —N/a | |
| 2017 | 21 November | United Kingdom | Gorillaz | Humanz Tour | Little Simz | —N/a | |
| 2017 | 22 November | Netherlands | Kensington | —N/a | Sue The Night; The Brahms; Kim Janssen | —N/a | |
| 2017 | 23 November | Netherlands | Kensington | —N/a | Sue The Night; The Brahms; Kim Janssen | —N/a | |
| 2017 | 24 November | Netherlands | Kensington | —N/a | Sue The Night; The Brahms; Kim Janssen | —N/a | |
| 2017 | 25 November | Netherlands | Kensington | —N/a | Sue The Night; The Brahms; Kim Janssen | —N/a | |
| 2017 | 26 November | Netherlands | Kensington | —N/a | Sue The Night; The Brahms; Kim Janssen | | |
| 2018 | 13 January | United Kingdom | Depeche Mode | Global Spirit Tour | —N/a | 16,309 / 16,309 | $1,529,315 |
| 2018 | 20 January | United States | Lady Gaga | Joanne World Tour | —N/a | 15,397 / 15,397 | $1,465,089 |
| 2018 | 13 February | Norway | Kygo | Kids In Love Tour | Gryffin | —N/a | |
| 2018 | 17 February | United States | The Chainsmokers | Memories Do Not Open Tour | Sigma | —N/a | |
| 2018 | 23 February | United States | Kendrick Lamar | The Damn Tour | James Blake | 16,220 / 16,220 | $1,108,958 |
| 2018 | 12 May | United States | Beth Hart | Fire on the Floor 2018 Tour | Judy Blank | —N/a | |
| 2018 | 26 May | United States | Katy Perry | Witness: The Tour | Tove Styrke | —N/a | |
| 2018 | 27 May | United States | Katy Perry | Witness: The Tour | Tove Styrke | —N/a | |
| 2018 | 9 June | Colombia | Shakira | El Dorado World Tour | —N/a | —N/a | |
| 2018 | 12 June | United States | Pearl Jam | Pearl Jam 2018 Tour | —N/a | —N/a | |
| 2018 | 13 June | United States | Pearl Jam | Pearl Jam 2018 Tour | —N/a | —N/a | |
| 2018 | 18 June | United Kingdom | Roger Waters | Us + Them Tour | —N/a | 56,524 / 58,620 | $5,146,945 |
| 2018 | 19 June | United Kingdom | Roger Waters | Us + Them Tour | —N/a | 56,524 / 58,620 | $5,146,945 |
| 2018 | 22 June | United Kingdom | Roger Waters | Us + Them Tour | —N/a | 56,524 / 58,620 | $5,146,945 |
| 2018 | 23 June | United Kingdom | Roger Waters | Us + Them Tour | —N/a | 56,524 / 58,620 | $5,146,945 |
| 2018 | 24 June | United States | Lenny Kravitz | Raise Vibration Tour 2018 | —N/a | —N/a | |
| 2018 | 7 July | United States | Paul Simon | Homeward Bound Farewell Tour | —N/a | —N/a | |
| 2018 | 8 July | United States | Paul Simon | Homeward Bound Farewell Tour | —N/a | —N/a | |
| 2018 | 7 October | Ireland | U2 | Experience + Innocence Tour | —N/a | 33,542 / 33,542 | $4,300,638 |
| 2018 | 8 October | Ireland | U2 | Experience + Innocence Tour | —N/a | 33,542 / 33,542 | $4,300,638 |
| 2018 | 11 October | Canada | Shania Twain | Now Tour | —N/a | —N/a | |
| 2018 | 18 October | Netherlands | Hardwell | Hardwell & Metropole Orkest Present: Symphony – The Global Revolution Of Dance | | | |
| 2019 | 10 March | United Kingdom | Bastille | Still Avoiding Tomorrow Tour | Lewis Capaldi | —N/a | |
| 2019 | 25 March | United States | Nicki Minaj | The Nicki Wrld Tour | Josylvio | 8,846 / 10,056 | $823,432 |
| 2019 | 17 May | Australia | Hugh Jackman | The Man. The Music. The Show. | —N/a | 10,825 / 10,825 | $782,606 |
| 2019 | 23 May | United States | Backstreet Boys | DNA World Tour | —N/a | —N/a | |
| 2019 | 8 June | United Kingdom | Elton John | Farewell Yellow Brick Road Tour | —N/a | 12,551 / 12,551 | $1,022,623 |
| 2019 | 13 June | United States | Mariah Carey | Caution World Tour | —N/a | —N/a | |
| 2019 | 17 June | United Kingdom | Elton John | Farewell Yellow Brick Road Tour | —N/a | 12,764 / 12,764 | $1,025,363 |
| 2019 | 18 June | United States | Tool | Tool Europe Tour 2019 | FIEND | —N/a | |
| 2019 | 8 July | United States | Christina Aguilera | The X Tour | Drax Project | —N/a | |
| 2019 | 23 August | United States | Ariana Grande | Sweetener World Tour | Ella Mai and Social House | 32,407 / 32,407 | $2,423,340 |
| 2019 | 24 August | United States | Ariana Grande | Sweetener World Tour | Ella Mai and Social House | 32,407 / 32,407 | $2,423,340 |
| 2019 | 11 September | United States | Ariana Grande | Sweetener World Tour | Ella Mai and Social House | 15,844 / 15,844 | $1,238,670 |
| 2019 | 12 September | United Kingdom | Muse | Simulation Theory World Tour | Des Rocs | —N/a | |
| 2019 | 25 September | United Kingdom | Little Mix | LM5 The Tour | Keelie Walker | —N/a | |
| 2019 | 30 September | United States | Cher | Here We Go Again Tour | Bright Light Bright Light | 9,576 / 10,750 | $1,092,907 |
| 2019 | 25 October | Netherlands | Krezip | Krezip + Support | —N/a | —N/a | |
| 2019 | 26 October | Netherlands | Krezip | Krezip + Support | —N/a | —N/a | |
| 2019 | 5 December | Netherlands | Kensington | —N/a | Amber Run; Waltzburg | —N/a | |
| 2019 | 6 December | Netherlands | Kensington | —N/a | Amber Run; Waltzburg | —N/a | |
| 2019 | 7 December | Netherlands | Kensington | —N/a | Amber Run; Waltzburg | —N/a | |
| 2020 | 24 January | Japan | Hatsune Miku | Hatsune Miku Expo 2020 Europe | Megurine Luka Kagamine Rin & Len Meiko Kaito | —N/a | |
| 2020 | 15 February | United States | Halsey | Manic World Tour | —N/a | —N/a | |
| 2020 | 23 February | United States | Tenacious D | Post-Apocalypto Tour | —N/a | —N/a | |
| 2022 | 21 March | United Kingdom | Genesis | The Last Domino? Tour | —N/a | —N/a | |
| 2022 | 22 March | United Kingdom | Genesis | The Last Domino? Tour | —N/a | —N/a | |
| 2022 | 27 March | Germany | Hans Zimmer | Europe Tour 2022 | —N/a | —N/a | |
| 2022 | 5 April | United Kingdom | Bastille | Give Me the Future Tour | Rondé | —N/a | |
| 2022 | 8 April | Netherlands | BLØF | Tour 2022 | Wies | —N/a | |
| 2022 | 9 April | Netherlands | BLØF | Tour 2022 | Wies | —N/a | |
| 2022 | 14 April | Nigeria | Burna Boy | Spaceship Drift Tour | Rich2Gether | 17,000 | $1,564,720 |
| 2022 | 17 May | United Kingdom | Dua Lipa | Future Nostalgia Tour | Griff | 33,642 / 33,642 | $1,699,256 |
| 2022 | 18 May | United Kingdom | Dua Lipa | Future Nostalgia Tour | Griff | 33,642 / 33,642 | $1,699,256 |
| 2022 | 25 May | Italy | Zucchero | World Wild Tour 2022 | —N/a | —N/a | |
| 2022 | 9 July | United Kingdom | Harry Styles | Love On Tour | Wolf Alice | 13,080 / 13,080 | $1,056,199 |
| 2022 | 27 August | Netherlands | Kensington | —N/a | The Vices; Paceshifters | —N/a | |
| 2022 | 30 August | Netherlands | Kensington | —N/a | The Vices; Paceshifters | —N/a | |
| 2022 | 1 September | Netherlands | Kensington | —N/a | The Vices; Paceshifters | —N/a | |
| 2022 | 2 September | Netherlands | Kensington | —N/a | The Vices; Paceshifters | —N/a | |
| 2022 | 3 September | Netherlands | Kensington | —N/a | The Vices; Paceshifters | —N/a | |
| 2022 | 4 September | Netherlands | Kensington | —N/a | The Vices; Paceshifters | —N/a | |
| 2022 | 7 October | United States | Kendrick Lamar | The Big Steppers Tour | Baby Keem; Tanna Leone | —N/a | |
| 2022 | 8 October | United States | Kendrick Lamar | The Big Steppers Tour | Baby Keem; Tanna Leone | —N/a | |
| 2022 | 9 October | United States | Backstreet Boys | DNA World Tour | —N/a | —N/a | |
| 2022 | 10 October | United Kingdom | Deep Purple | The Whoosh! Tour | Jefferson Starship | —N/a | |
| 2022 | 25 November | United Kingdom | The Cure | Lost World Tour | —N/a | —N/a | |
| 2022 | 26 November | United States | Beth Hart | The Thankful Tour 2022 | John Oates | —N/a | |
| 2022 | 27 November | Finland | Nightwish | Human. :II: Nature. World Tour | Turmion Kätilöt; Beast in Black | —N/a | |
| 2022 | 28 November | Finland | Nightwish | Human. :II: Nature. World Tour | Turmion Kätilöt; Beast in Black | —N/a | |
| 2022 | 29 November | Netherlands & United States | Within Temptation & Evanescence | Worlds Collide Tour | Smash Into Pieces | —N/a | |
| 2022 | 30 November | Netherlands & United States | Within Temptation & Evanescence | Worlds Collide Tour | Smash Into Pieces | —N/a | |
| 2022 | 1 December | United States | Alter Bridge | Pawns & Kings Tour | Mammoth WVH; Halestorm | —N/a | |
| 2022 | 3 December | Netherlands | Hardwell | Rebels Never Die World Tour | Tim Hox | | |
| 2022 | 22 December | South Korea | Blackpink | Born Pink World Tour | —N/a | 18,641 / 24,641 | $2,998,488 |
| 2023 | 7 January | Netherlands | André Rieu | —N/a | —N/a | —N/a | |
| 2023 | 28 January | United Kingdom | Robbie Williams | XXV Tour | Lufthaus | —N/a | |
| 2023 | 29 January | United Kingdom | Robbie Williams | XXV Tour | Lufthaus | —N/a | |
| 2023 | 10 February | South Korea | Ateez | The Fellowship: Break The Wall | —N/a | —N/a | |
| 2023 | 13 February | United Kingdom | Robbie Williams | XXV Tour | Lufthaus | —N/a | |
| 2023 | 16 February | Italy | Eros Ramazzotti | Battito Infinito World Tour | —N/a | —N/a | |
| 2023 | 17 February | United States | Dropkick Murphys | Turn Up That Dial Tour | Jesse Ahern; The Rumjacks; Pennywise | —N/a | |
| 2023 | 23 February | United States | Lizzo | The Special Tour | DJ Sophia; Bree Runway | —N/a | |
| 2023 | 24 February | United Kingdom | Bring Me the Horizon | Survival Horror EU Tour | Static Dress; Poorstacy; A Day To Remember | —N/a | |
| 2023 | 25 February | Scotland | Lewis Capaldi | Broken by Desire to Be Heavenly Sent Tour | Only The Poets | —N/a | |
| 2023 | 27 February | Italy | Måneskin | Rush! World Tour | —N/a | —N/a | |
| 2023 | 1 March | United Kingdom | George Ezra | —N/a | Passenger | —N/a | |
| 2023 | 6 March | United States | Chris Brown | Under The Influence Tour | —N/a | —N/a | |
| 2023 | 7 March | United States | Chris Brown | Under The Influence Tour | —N/a | —N/a | |
| 2023 | 10 March | Netherlands | Various | Holland Zingt Hazes | —N/a | —N/a | |
| 2023 | 11 March | Netherlands | Various | Holland Zingt Hazes | —N/a | —N/a | |
| 2023 | 12 March | Netherlands | Herinneringen Top 50 Concert | —N/a | —N/a | —N/a | |
| 2023 | 17 March | Netherlands | Various | Holland Zingt Hazes | —N/a | —N/a | |
| 2023 | 18 March | Netherlands | Various | Holland Zingt Hazes | —N/a | —N/a | |
| 2023 | 20 March | United States | Snoop Dogg | I Wanna Thank Me Tour | —N/a | —N/a | |
| 2023 | 22 March | United Kingdom | Michael Bublé | Higher Tour | —N/a | —N/a | |
| 2023 | 23 March | United States | Chris Brown | Under The Influence Tour | —N/a | —N/a | |
| 2023 | 4 April | United Kingdom | Roger Waters | This Is Not a Drill | —N/a | —N/a | |
| 2023 | 6 April | United Kingdom | Roger Waters | This Is Not a Drill | —N/a | —N/a | |
| 2023 | 7 April | United Kingdom | Roger Waters | This Is Not a Drill | —N/a | —N/a | |
| 2023 | 26 April | United States | Kevin Hart | Reality Check Tour | —N/a | —N/a | |
| 2023 | 29 April | Netherlands | Chef'Special | 15th anniversary Tour | —N/a | —N/a | |
| 2023 | 1 May | United States | Barack Obama | Live in person | —N/a | —N/a | |
| 2023 | 5 May | United Kingdom | Arctic Monkeys | The Car World Tour | Inhaler | —N/a | |
| 2023 | 6 May | United Kingdom | Arctic Monkeys | The Car World Tour | Inhaler | —N/a | |
| 2023 | 9 May | United Kingdom | Sam Smith | GLORIA the Tour | Cat Burns | —N/a | |
| 2023 | 16 May | United Kingdom | Depeche Mode | Memento Mori World Tour | —N/a | —N/a | |
| 2023 | 18 May | United Kingdom | Depeche Mode | Memento Mori World Tour | —N/a | —N/a | |
| 2023 | 19 May | United States | Post Malone | Twelve Carat Tour | Rae Sremmurd | —N/a | |
| 2023 | 20 May | United States | Post Malone | Twelve Carat Tour | Rae Sremmurd | —N/a | |
| 2023 | 4 July | United States | Lana Del Rey | Live 2023 | Naaz | | |
| 2023 | 28 September | United States | 50 Cent | The Final Lap Tour | Busta Rhymes | | |
| 2023 | 8 October | United States | blink-182 | World Tour 2023/2024 | The Story So Far | | |
| 2023 | 15 October | United Kingdom | Louis Tomlinson | Faith in the Future World Tour | The Lathums; The Academic | | |
| 2023 | 1 December | United States | Madonna | The Celebration Tour | Bob the Drag Queen | 32,104 / 32,104 | $6,344,416 |
| 2023 | 2 December | United States | Madonna | The Celebration Tour | Bob the Drag Queen | 32,104 / 32,104 | $6,344,416 |
| 2024 | 6 April | Scotland | Simple Minds | 2024 Global Tour | | | |
| 2024 | 23 May | Trinidad and Tobago | Nicki Minaj | Pink Friday 2 World Tour | —N/a | —N/a | |
| 2024 | 24 May | United States | Olivia Rodrigo | Guts World Tour | Remi Wolf | - | - |
| 2024 | 25 May | United States | Olivia Rodrigo | Guts World Tour | Remi Wolf | - | - |
| 2024 | 13 June | South Korea | IVE | Show What I Have World Tour | —N/a | —N/a | —N/a |
| 2024 | 14 June | Colombia | Karol G | Mañana Será Bonito Tour | —N/a | —N/a | —N/a |
| 2024 | 19 June | United States | Doja Cat | The Scarlet Tour | —N/a | —N/a | —N/a |
| 2024 | 20 June | Australia | Troye Sivan | Something to Give Each Other Tour | Jodie Harsh | —N/a | —N/a |
| 2024 | 24 June | United States | Avenged Sevenfold | Life Is But a Dream Tour | Polyphia | | |
| 2024 | 10 July | United States | Megan Thee Stallion | Hot Girl Summer Tour | —N/a | —N/a | —N/a |
| 2024 | 11 August | United States | Diana Ross | Legacy Tour | —N/a | —N/a | —N/a |
| 2024 | 15 August | United States | Justin Timberlake | The Forget Tomorrow World Tour | | | |
| 2024 | 16 August | United States | Justin Timberlake | The Forget Tomorrow World Tour | | | |
| 2024 | 19 August | United States | Justin Timberlake | The Forget Tomorrow World Tour | | | |
| 2024 | 1 October | United States | Melanie Martinez | The Trilogy Tour | | | |
| 2024 | 3 October | United States | Jonas Brothers | Five Albums. One Night. The World Tour | | | |
| 2024 | 10 October | United States | Janet Jackson | Janet Jackson: Together Again | Wyclef Jean | —N/a | —N/a |
| 2025 | 3 February | South Korea | Ateez | Towards The Light: Will To Power | | | |
| 2025 | 17 February | United States | Gracie Abrams | The Secret of Us Tour | Dora Jar | | |
| 2025 | 23 March | United States | Sabrina Carpenter | Short n' Sweet Tour | Rachel Chinouriri | | |
| 2025 | 1 April | South Korea | Tomorrow X Together | Act: Promise | | | |
| 2025 | 22 April | United States | Usher | Usher: Past Present Future | | | |
| 2025 | 23 April | United States | Usher | Usher: Past Present Future | | | |
| 2025 | 25 April | United States | Usher | Usher: Past Present Future | | | |
| 2025 | 30 April | United States | Twenty One Pilots | The Clancy World Tour | Balu Brigada | | |
| 2025 | 1 May | Norway | Aurora | What Happened to the Earth? | Fredrik Svabø & Pomme | —N/a | —N/a |
| 2025 | 28 May | Canada | Tate McRae | Miss Possessive Tour | Benee | | |
| 2025 | 3 June | United Kingdom | Dua Lipa | Radical Optimism Tour | Alessi Rose | | |
| 2025 | 4 June | United Kingdom | Dua Lipa | Radical Optimism Tour | Alessi Rose | | |
| 2025 | 20 June | Puerto Rico | Rauw Alejandro | Cosa Nuestra World Tour | | | |
| 2025 | 21 June | Japan | Ado | Hibana World Tour | N/A | | |
| 2025 | 29 June | United States | Nine Inch Nails | Peel It Back Tour | Boys Noize | | |
| 2025 | 2 July | United States | Green Day | The Saviors Tour | Hot Milk | | |
| 2025 | 3 July | Australia | Kylie Minogue | Tension Tour | Jodie Harsh | | |
| 2025 | 9 August | South Korea | Jin | RunSeokjin Ep. Tour | | | |
| 2025 | 10 August | South Korea | Jin | RunSeokjin Ep. Tour | | | |
| 2025 | 20 August | Canada | Shawn Mendes | On the Road Again Tour | Lubiana; Maro | | |
| 2025 | 28 August | South Korea | Enhypen | Walk The Line Tour | | | |
| 2025 | 7 November | United States | The Offspring | Supercharged Worldwide in 25 | Simple Plan | | |
| 2025 | 9 November | United States | Lady Gaga | The Mayhem Ball | —N/a | 16,375 / 16,375 | $3,219,043 |
| 2025 | 11 November | United States | Benson Boone | American Heart World Tour | Elliot James Reay | | |
| 2025 | 12 November | Sweden | Zara Larsson | Midnight Sun Tour | Omar Rudberg | | |
| 2026 | 27 January | United Kingdom | Raye | This Tour May Contain New Music | Absolutely; Amma | | |
| 2026 | 28 January | United Kingdom | Raye | This Tour May Contain New Music | Absolutely; Amma | | |
| 2026 | 7 February | Netherlands / Sweden | Epica / Amaranthe | Arcane Dimensions Tour | Charlotte Wessels' The Obsession | | |
| 2026 | 12 February | Netherlands | Joost Klein | World Tour 2026 | N/A | 14,500 - 17,000 | €800,000 - €1,000,000 |
| 2026 | 25 February | United Kingdom | Florence and the Machine | Everybody Scream Tour | Paris Paloma | | |
| 2026 | 3 March | United States | MGK | Lost Americana Tour | Julia Wolf | | |
| 2026 | 10 April | Australia | 5 Seconds of Summer | Everyone's a Star! World Tour | South Arcade; Master Peace | | |
| 2026 | 20 April | United Kingdom | Louis Tomlinson | How Did We Get Here? World Tour | ADMT; Pale Waves | | |
| 2026 | 22 April | Spain | Rosalía | Lux Tour | | | |
| 2026 | 23 April | Spain | Rosalía | Lux Tour | | | |
| 2026 | 4 May | Australia | Tame Impala | Deadbeat Tour | RIP Magic | | |
| 2026 | 8 May | United States | The Neighbourhood | Wourld Tour | Neggy Gemmy; Noise Dept. | | |
| 2026 | 9 May | United Kingdom | Olivia Dean | The Art of Loving Live | Alice Phoebe Lou | | |
| 2026 | 14 May | United States | Conan Gray | Wishbone World Tour | Esha Tewari | | |
| 2026 | 21 May | United States | Madison Beer | The Locket Tour | Lulu Simon; Isabel LaRosa | | |
| 2026 | 30 May | South Korea | TWICE | This Is For World Tour | | | |
| 2026 | 31 May | South Korea | TWICE | This Is For World Tour | | | |
| 2026 | 14 June | United Kingdom | Olivia Dean | The Art of Loving Live | Jalen Ngonda | | |
| 2026 | 12 October | United States | J. Cole | The Fall-Off World Tour | | | |
| 2026 | 13 October | United States | J. Cole | The Fall-Off World Tour | | | |
| 2026 | 18 October | South Korea | LE SSERAFIM | Pureflow Tour | | | |
| 2027 | 28 February | Japan | Kenshi Yonezu | Ghost World Tour | N/A | | |

== See also ==
- List of indoor arenas in the Netherlands
