= Sheffield Arena =

Arena in Sheffield, South Yorkshire, England

Sheffield Arena Utilita Arena Sheffield

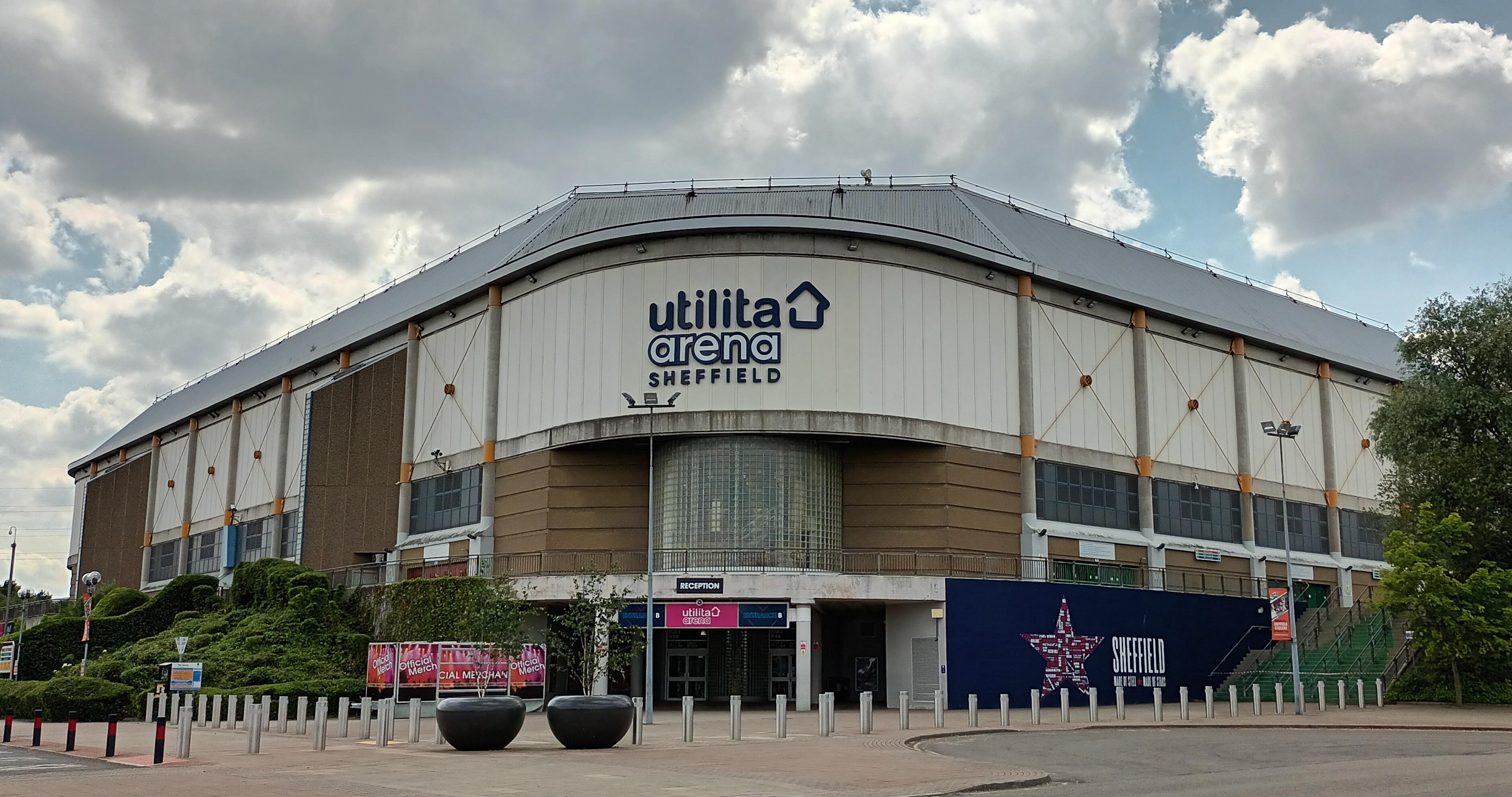
- Exterior view of venue (June 2022)
- Interactive map of Sheffield Arena; Utilita Arena Sheffield
- Former names: Sheffield Arena (1991–2002, 2007–10, 2015–17, 2021); Hallam FM Arena (2002–07); Motorpoint Arena (2010–15); FlyDSA Arena (2017–21)
- Address: Broughton Lane, Sheffield, S9 2DF, England
- Coordinates: 53°24′0″N 1°25′8″W
- Operator: ASM Global
- Capacity: Concert: 13,600; Ice hockey: 9,300; Steel Hall: 3,500
- Public transit: Y TT; Arena / Olympic Legacy Park

Construction
- Groundbreaking: 1989
- Built: November 1990 (roof structure)
- Opened: 30 May 1991
- Renovated: 2013
- Cost: £34 million
- Architects: HOK Sport, Lister Drew Haines Barrow
- Project manager: Roger Colebourn
- Structural engineer: Cleveland Bridge & Engineering Company
- Services engineers: Oscar Faber & Partners
- Main contractor: RM Douglas

Tenants
- Sheffield Steelers (EIHL) (1991–present); Sheffield Sharks (BBL) (1994–2004); 1991 World Student Games

Website
- Venue Website

Sheffield Arena, known for sponsorship purposes as Utilita Arena Sheffield, is a multi-purpose arena located in Sheffield, England. It is situated near Meadowhall and lies between Sheffield city centre and Rotherham town centre.

Opened in 1991, it is used for concerts and sporting events, and is also home to the Sheffield Steelers ice hockey club. Attendance for all events at the venue has totalled around 14 million since its opening. It has a maximum capacity of 13,600.

== History ==
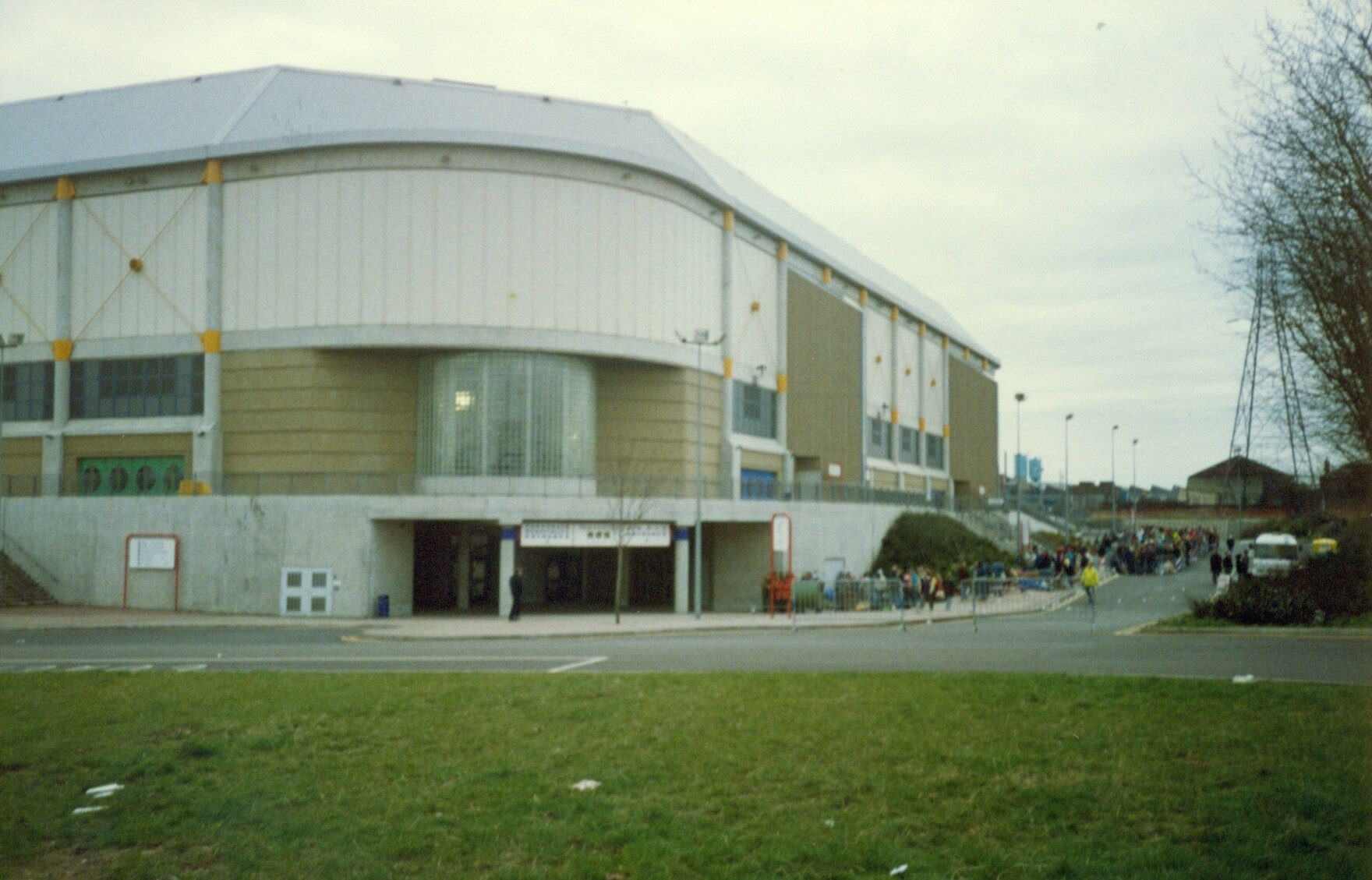
Spectators queuing outside the arena in 1993

Constructed at a cost of £34 million, it was opened by Queen Elizabeth II on 30 May 1991 as Sheffield Arena. The first concert took place that evening, Paul Simon playing as part of his "Born at the Right Time" tour. The arena then took on the role of Gymnastics Hall for the 1991 World Student Games which were held in the city and which prompted the investment in, and development of, both the arena and nearby Don Valley Stadium.

Since the venue opened in 1991 the arena has averaged 122 shows a year with over 650,000 customers passing through the doors each year.

The Arena was the location of the infamous Labour Party Sheffield Rally during the 1992 United Kingdom general election which was widely criticised for being prematurely triumphalist.

The arena was renamed Hallam FM Arena in 2002, but returned to its original name from 1 November 2007. On 9 August 2010, Sheffield Arena was officially renamed Motorpoint Arena Sheffield, after the Derby based car sales company invested £1 million to rename the venue. In August 2015 the arena was once again rebranded as Sheffield Arena, however in September 2017 nearby Doncaster Sheffield Airport began sponsoring the arena giving it a rebrand, FlyDSA Arena. In 2021, Utilita Energy took over sponsorship of the arena.

The arena underwent a major renovation installing a new roof, doors, seats, lighting, catering and toilet facilities in July 2013.

In 2013 the arena was ranked as the 18th most popular arena in the world and this was in the year that the building was closed for over 2 months to enable the multi-million pound refurbishment of the venue. More recently, in 2019, Pollstar ranked the arena at 65th worldwide and 7th in the UK as part of their 'Top 200 Arena Venues' with 311,125 tickets sold, up 5 places from 70th in 2018.

=== COVID-19 pandemic ===
During the COVID-19 pandemic in the United Kingdom, the car park of the arena was used as a drive-through phlebotomy service operated by Sheffield Teaching Hospitals NHS Foundation Trust, the first of its kind in the country. This allowed patients to attend for routine blood tests from within the isolation of their cars, reducing the requirement for patients to attend GPs or hospital clinics. The drive-through phlebotomy service opened on 8 April 2020 for patients with underlying health conditions, and was expanded to become available to all patients in the Sheffield area on 27 April. The drive-through was deemed such a success that it was turned into a permanent service, relocating first to a warehouse next to the Sheffield Parkway before settling into a permanent site next to the Northern General Hospital after the end of the pandemic.

To support the rollout of the local COVID-19 vaccination campaign, the Sheffield NHS Vaccination Centre opened at the arena on 25 January 2021, taking up the space previously occupied by the drive-through phlebotomy clinic before its relocation. The vaccination centre remained open until 26 July, when it was relocated to the former NHS Blood and Transplant building next to the Northern General Hospital to allow the arena to reopen for its usual events.

In April 2020, the interior space of the arena was used as a storage location for 1,800 additional hospital beds which were being delivered to hospitals in Sheffield to support pandemic operations. Photographs of the hospital beds inside the arena later leaked onto social media, and the local NHS trust issued a statement denying rumours that the arena was going to be repurposed as a Nightingale temporary hospital. In August 2020, an ophthalmology clinic was opened inside the arena featuring eye imaging suites, remaining in operation until the arena reopened for normal usage after the pandemic.

== Events ==
=== Music ===
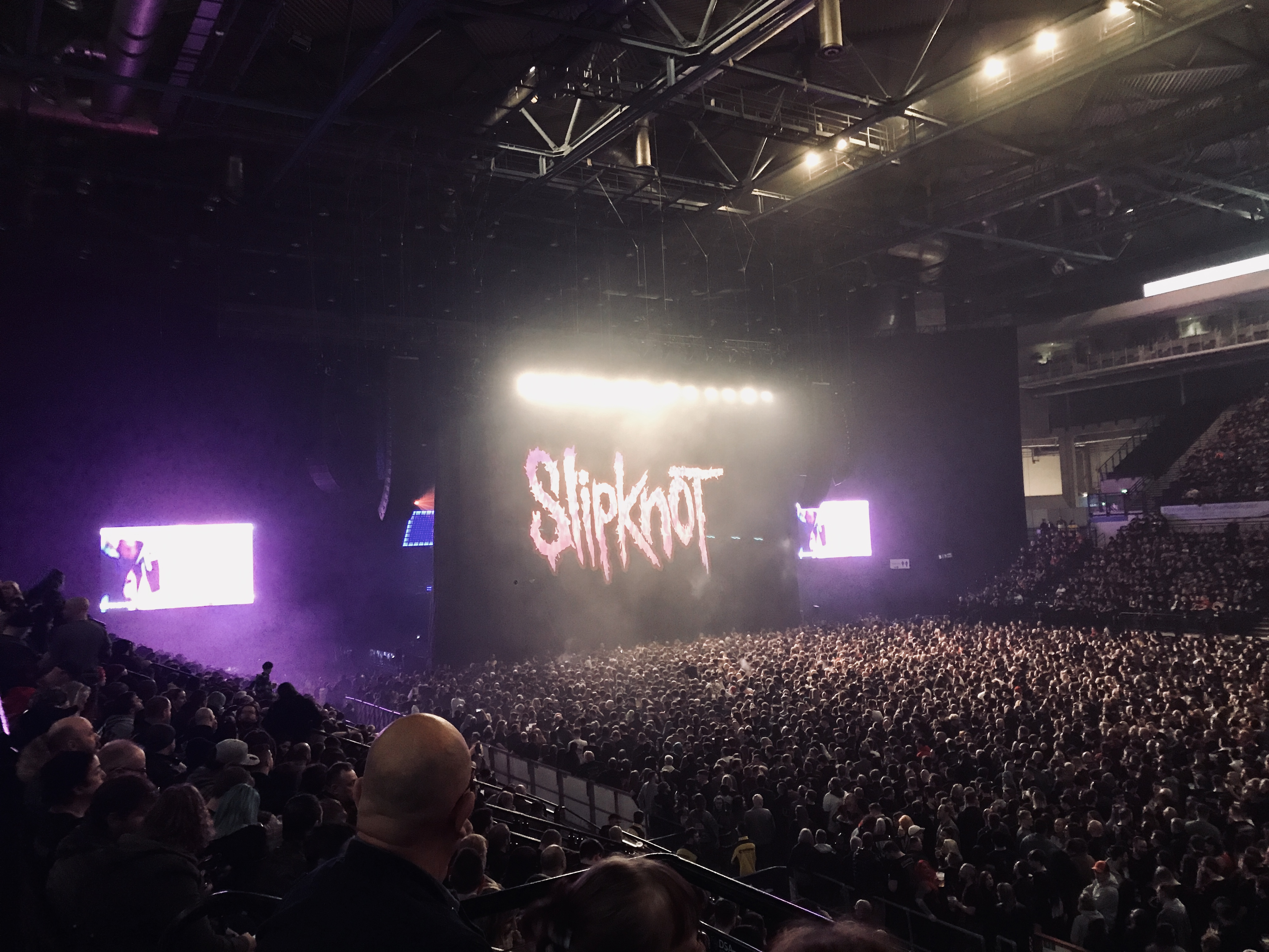
Slipknot @ Sheffield Arena, January 2020 – We Are Not Your Kind World Tour

Sheffield's own Arctic Monkeys broke the Arena ticket sales records when they instantly sold out over 13,600 tickets for their date at the arena in November 2013. The previous record of 13,300 was held by fellow Sheffield band Pulp in December 2012.

The venue's record attendance for a seated music concert is currently held by Little Mix when 12,485 customers attended their Get Weird Tour Saturday 23 April 2016. The record for most shows in Sheffield Arena is held by Irish boyband Westlife with 32 shows played to date.

British-Irish boy-band, One Direction played their last concert, before going on an indefinite hiatus, on 31 October 2015 at the arena. The arena held from somewhere between 35,000–37,000 people raising over 3 million dollars.

Entertainment events held at the Sheffield Arena
| Year | Date | Nationalities | Artists | Events | Supporting Acts | Attendance | Box Office |
|---|---|---|---|---|---|---|---|
| 1992 | 17 June | Ireland | U2 | Zoo TV Tour | The Fatima Mansions | | |
| 1993 | 16 May | England | Iron Maiden | Real Live Tour | The Almighty | | |
| 1994 | 14 November | Sweden | Roxette | Crash! Boom! Bang! | | | |
| 1995 | 4 April | United States | Janet Jackson | Janet World Tour | MN8 | | |
| 1995 | 3 December | United Kingdom | David Bowie | Outside Tour | | | |
| 1996 | 4 December | United States | Gloria Estefan | Evolution Tour | | | |
| 1997 | 8 September | United States | Toni Braxton | Secrets Tour | N/A | Unknown | |
| 1998 | 4 June | United States | Janet Jackson | The Velvet Rope Tour | Another Level | | |
| 1999 | 9 September | United States | Whitney Houston | My Love Is Your Love World Tour | | | |
| 1999 | 11 December | United States | Cher | Believe Tour | | | |
| 2001 | 6 March | Ireland | Westlife | Where Dreams Come True Tour | | | |
| 2001 | 7 March | Ireland | Westlife | Where Dreams Come True Tour | | | |
| 2001 | 8 March | Ireland | Westlife | Where Dreams Come True Tour | | | |
| 2002 | 1 May | Ireland | Westlife | World of Our Own Tour | | | |
| 2002 | 2 May | Ireland | Westlife | World of Our Own Tour | | | |
| 2002 | 3 May | Ireland | Westlife | World of Our Own Tour | | | |
| 2002 | 4 May | Ireland | Westlife | World of Our Own Tour | | | |
| 2002 | 5 May | Ireland | Westlife | World of Our Own Tour | | | |
| 2002 | 14 May | Australia | Kylie Minogue | KylieFever2002 | | | |
| 2002 | 15 May | Australia | Kylie Minogue | KylieFever2002 | | | |
| 2002 | 6 June | United States | Destiny's Child | Destiny's Child World Tour | Devin | | |
| 2003 | 18 July | Ireland | Westlife | Unbreakable Tour | | | |
| 2003 | 19 July | Ireland | Westlife | Unbreakable Tour | | | |
| 2003 | 21 July | Ireland | Westlife | Unbreakable Tour | | | |
| 2003 | 22 July | Ireland | Westlife | Unbreakable Tour | | | |
| 2003 | 6 July | United Kingdom | Iron Maiden | Dance of Death World Tour | Funeral for a Friend | | |
| 2004 | 13 February | Canada | Shania Twain | Up! Tour | Björn Againe | | |
| 2004 | 8 March | Canada | Shania Twain | Up! Tour | Björn Againe | | |
| 2004 | 29 April | Ireland | Westlife | The No 1's Tour | | | |
| 2004 | 30 April | Ireland | Westlife | The No 1's Tour | | | |
| 2004 | 1 May | Ireland | Westlife | The No 1's Tour | | | |
| 2004 | 19 May | United States | Cher | The Farewell Tour | | | |
| 2005 | 18 March | Ireland | Westlife | Back Home Tour | | | |
| 2005 | 19 March | Ireland | Westlife | Back Home Tour | | | |
| 2005 | 7 June | United States | Destiny's Child | Destiny Fulfilled... and Lovin' It | | | |
| 2006 | 27 April | Ireland | Westlife | Face to Face Tour | | | |
| 2006 | 28 April | Ireland | Westlife | Face to Face Tour | | | |
| 2006 | 18 July | United States | Guns N' Roses | Chinese Democracy Tour | Bullet for My Valentine | | |
| 2006 | 18 November | United Kingdom | Muse | Black Holes and Revelations Tour | The Noisettes | | |
| 2006 | 18 December | United Kingdom | Iron Maiden | A Matter of Life and Death Tour | Trivium; Lauren Harris | | |
| 2007 | 13 March | Ireland | Westlife | The Love Tour | | | |
| 2007 | 14 March | Ireland | Westlife | The Love Tour | | | |
| 2007 | 7 December | Barbados | Rihanna | Good Girl Gone Bad Tour | | | |
| 2008 | 25 March | Ireland | Westlife | Back Home Tour | | | |
| 2008 | 26 March | Ireland | Westlife | Back Home Tour | | | |
| 2008 | 25 May | Ireland | Westlife | Back Home Tour | | | |
| 2008 | 29 November | United Kingdom | Coldplay | Viva la Vida Tour | | | |
| 2009 | 28 February | United States | Metallica | World Magnetic Tour | Machine Head; The Sword | | |
| 2009 | 7 June | United States | Beyoncé | I Am... World Tour | | 11,049 / 11,049 | $901,750 |
| 2009 | 18 November | United Kingdom | Muse | The Resistance Tour | | | |
| 2010 | 9 May | Ireland | Westlife | Where We Are Tour | | | |
| 2010 | 10 May | Ireland | Westlife | Where We Are Tour | | | |
| 2010 | 13 May | Barbados | Rihanna | Last Girl on Earth Tour | | | |
| 2010 | 4 June | United States | Lady Gaga | The Monster Ball Tour | Semi Precious Weapons | Unknown | |
| 2011 | 28 March | Ireland | Westlife | Gravity Tour | | | |
| 2011 | 29 March | Ireland | Westlife | Gravity Tour | | | |
| 2011 | 24 July | United Kingdom | Iron Maiden | The Final Frontier World Tour | Airbourne | 11,650 / 11,650 | $711,879 |
| 2011 | 5 November | United States | Britney Spears | Femme Fatale Tour | Joe Jonas | | |
| 2011 | 19 November | Barbados | Rihanna | Loud Tour | | | |
| 2012 | 13 May | Ireland | Westlife | Greatest Hits Tour | | | |
| 2012 | 19 May | Ireland | Westlife | Greatest Hits Tour | | | |
| 2012 | 12 June | Ireland | Westlife | Greatest Hits Tour | | | |
| 2012 | 17 June | United States | Blink-182 | 20th Anniversary Tour (Blink-182) | | | |
| 2014 | 30 March | United States | Justin Timberlake | The 20/20 Experience World Tour | DJ Freestyle | | |
| 2014 | 13 November | Australia | Kylie Minogue | Kiss Me Once Tour | Third Party | | |
| 2014 | 20 November | United States | Lady Gaga | ArtRave: The Artpop Ball | Lady Starlight | | |
| 2015 | 28 February | Ireland | The Script | No Sound Without Silence Tour | Colton Avery; Tinie Tempah | Unknown | |
| 2016 | 12 March | United Kingdom | Ellie Goulding | Delirium World Tour | John Newman | | |
| 2016 | 5 April | Australia | 5 Seconds of Summer | Sounds Live Feels Live World Tour | Don Broco | | |
| 2017 | 10 May | United Kingdom | Iron Maiden | The Book of Souls World Tour | Shinedown | 9,043 / 10,566 | $639,499 |
| 2017 | 21 June | United Kingdom | Electric Light Orchestra | Alone in the Universe Tour | Tom Chaplin | | |
| 2017 | 3 July | United States | Green Day | Revolution Radio Tour | Rancid | | |
| 2017 | 17 October | United Kingdom | Little Mix | The Glory Days Tour | Lina Makhul | | |
| 2017 | 27 October | United Kingdom | Little Mix | The Glory Days Tour | Lina Makhul | | |
| 2017 | 28 October | United Kingdom | Little Mix | The Glory Days Tour | Lina Makhul | | |
| 2018 | 14 December | United Kingdom | Def Leppard | Hysteria & More Tour | Cheap Trick | | |
| 2019 | 25 January | United Kingdom | The 1975 | Music For Cars Tour | | | |
| 2019 | 7 June | Ireland | Westlife | The Twenty Tour | The Rua, Keelie Walker | | |
| 2019 | 8 June | Ireland | Westlife | The Twenty Tour | The Rua, Keelie Walker | | |
| 2019 | 19 September | United States | Ariana Grande | Sweetener World Tour | Social House | | |
| 2019 | 28 October | England | Little Mix | LM5: The Tour | TBA | | |
| 2019 | 29 October | England | Little Mix | LM5: The Tour | TBA | | |
| 2022 | 28 November | Ireland | Westlife | The Wild Dreams Tour | | | |
| 2023 | 30 September | England | The Reytons | What's rock and Roll Tour | TBA | | |
| 2023 | 10 November | England | Louis Tomlinson | Faith in the Future World Tour | | | |
| 2025 | 23 May | Australia | Kylie Minogue | Tension Tour | Jodie Harsh | | |
| 2025 | 10 October | United States | Katy Perry | The Lifetimes Tour | | | |

=== Comedy ===
The arena is a regular venue for some of the world's best known Comedians such as Russell Brand, Lee Evans, Jack Whitehall, Eddie Izzard and Peter Kay who in 2011 played the arena for 5 nights running with all shows selling out within hours of going on sale. In June 2018 Michael McInytyre broke the venue's record attendance for a seated comedy show when his Big World Tour played the FlyDSA Arena on Saturday 23 June 2018 in front of 12,347 fans.

=== Sheffield Steelers ===
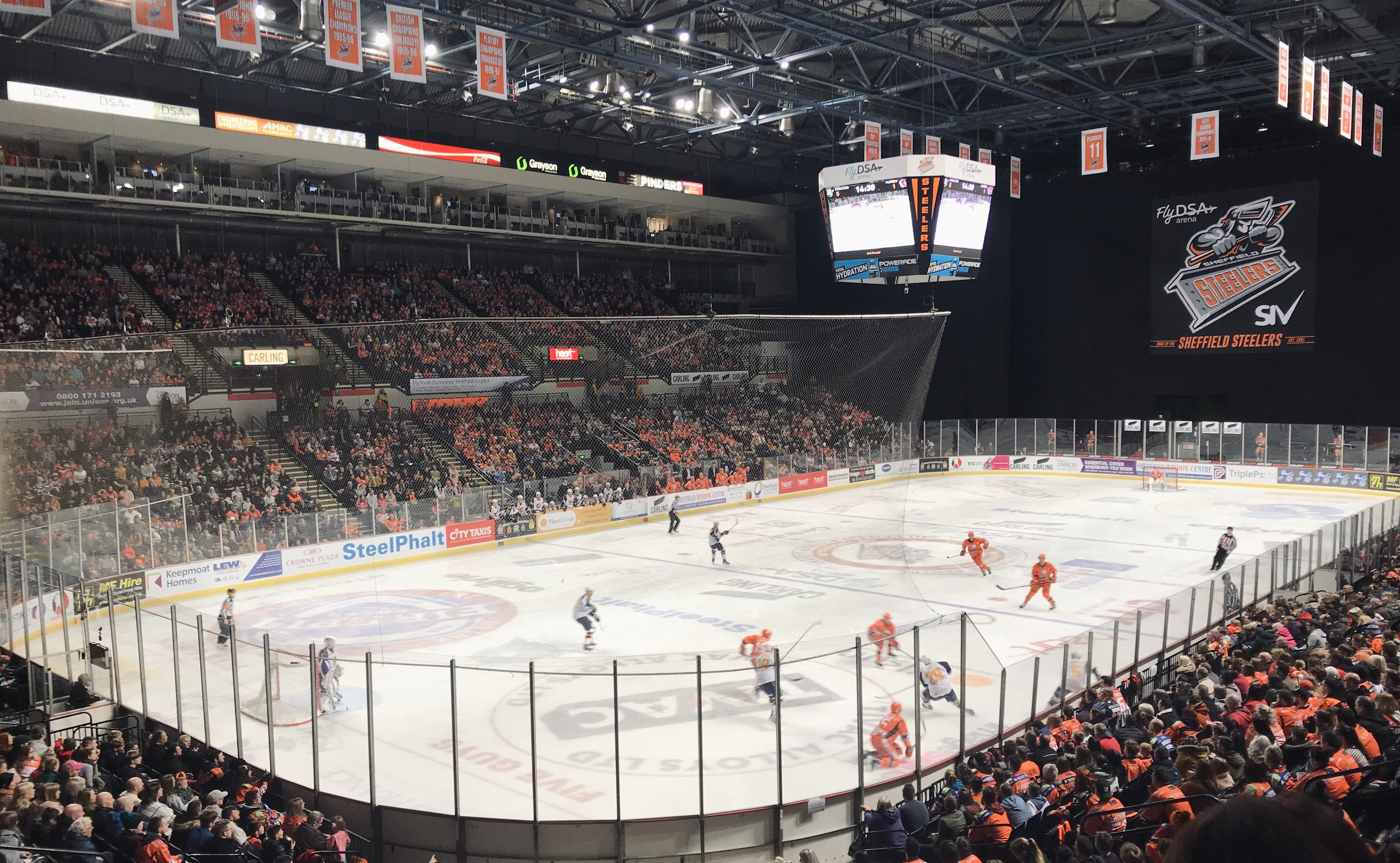
Sheffield Steelers v Guildford Flames @ Sheffield Arena, January 2020

The arena is the home to the city's Elite Ice Hockey League team, the Sheffield Steelers, who began to play at the arena in 1991. Whilst the standard capacity for ice hockey at the arena is around 9,300, the Steelers have recorded crowds of over 10,000 in the building with extra seating being installed at the venue. In 2019 the Steelers were the highest ranked team in the UK in terms of attendance and 35th in Europe drawing an average crowd of 6,045 to the arena.

The first ever competitive Sheffield Steelers game at Sheffield Arena took place on Sunday 6 October 1991, when the Steelers were held to a 3–3 draw against Chelmsford Chieftains in front of 300 spectators. However, the first Ice Hockey game played at the Sheffield Arena took place on Thursday 26 September 1991 when Durham Wasps beat a Sheffield Steelers select 7–1 to win the World Leisure Cup. Durham's Rick Brebant scored the first goal at 2:18 in front of an estimated crowd of 2,000.

In February 2020 it was announced that the arena had secured planning permission to install a new 22-ton machine to make production of the ice surface more cost-effective and environmentally friendly.

=== Disney On Ice ===
Disney On Ice holds the record for the most performances & customers of any touring show to perform at the Arena. Feld Entertainment has promoted the show every year since the building opened over November/December. As of 2013 there have been 260 performances seen by 1.3 million customers.

=== Other events ===
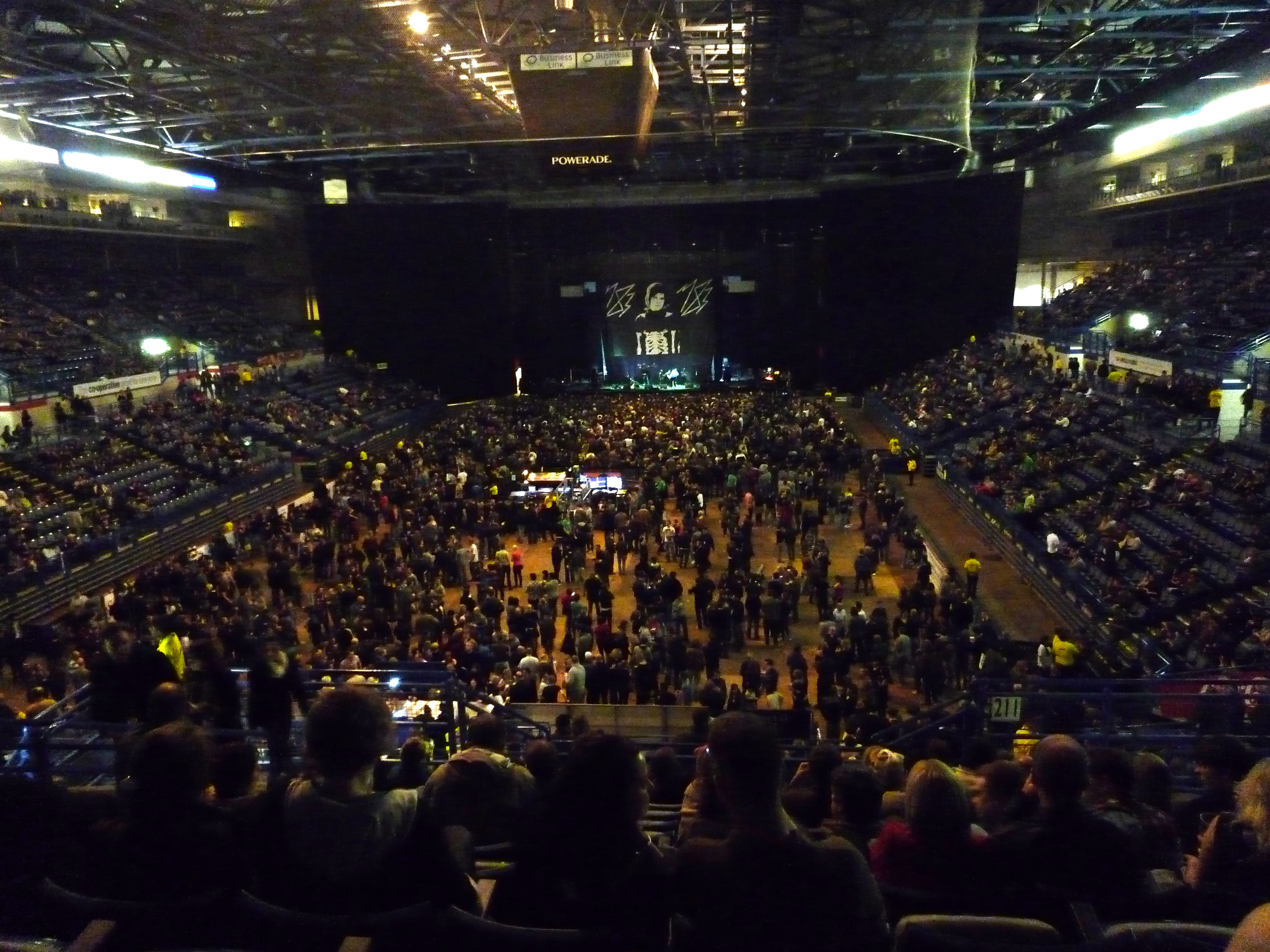
Sheffield Arena Interior

The arena was the location for the Labour Party's 1992 Sheffield Rally. Attended by over 10,000 party members and the entire shadow cabinet. Held just before that year's general election, which Labour was widely expected to win, the event is often seen as a factor in the party's defeat. While the event was seen as a success to those within the hall, many commentators, and Labour politicians, viewed it as triumphalist in nature. However, it has also been asserted that the event had negligible impact on the outcome, with a fall in the party's support having already occurred.

TV shows such as The X Factor, Britain's Got Talent, Strictly Come Dancing and Dancing on Ice visit the arena every year as part of their tours. It hosted the BBC revival of Gladiators in 2023, hosted it again on select dates during August 2024 and again in July and August 2025; the arena previously hosted the live show during Easter 1995.

The arena has hosted major special high-profile events, including The International Indian Film Academy Awards, which took place on Saturday, 9 June 2007 and was broadcast live around the world. This included a season hosted by the city of Sheffield and nearby Leeds. Also, in 2009, the arena hosted the annual BBC Radio 1Xtra concert and the 2009 BBC Sports Personality of the Year.

The arena has hosted major boxing events such as when Joe Calzaghe first won his WBO world title here on 11 October 1997 against former world champion Chris Eubank. On the same bill Sheffield born Naseem Hamed defended his WBO title against Jose Badillo. On 26 November 2005 Ricky Hatton extended his unbeaten record to 40–0, defending his IBF and Ring Magazine Junior Welterweight world titles and winning the WBA belt by 9th-round knockout against Carlos Maussa. Sheffield fighter Clinton Woods also defended his IBF light-heavyweight title against Mexican Julio César González on two occasions, winning on points both times. Kell Brook has had many fights here, his most notable being a fourth-round knockout victory of Vyacheslav Senchenko.

The Great Britain men's national basketball team played a test match against Portugal in that arena in preparation for the 2012 Olympics.

As well as being home to the Sheffield Steelers the venue has also hosted other ice hockey events such as the 2019 Super Series between USA and Canada featuring many ex-NHL stars and has acted as a neutral site for the EIHL Challenge Cup final.

The arena has hosted many professional wrestling events held by companies including WWE, NXT and 5 Star Wrestling over the years dating as far back as the WWE UK Rampage events in 1992 and 1993.

Since 2007, it has played host to the Premier League Darts.

Every year students from both Sheffield Hallam and The University of Sheffield assemble to watch the final game of their varsity play out as both universities ice hockey teams play and the stadium fills to capacity.

== Management ==
ASM Global has taken over the operation of Utilita Arena Sheffield and Sheffield City Hall, starting in January 2025. This marks a new chapter for both venues, with ASM Global aiming to reimagine the Utilita Arena as a world-class touring destination.

== Transport ==
=== Road ===
The arena is easily accessible by road with the nearest motorway junctions being Junction 34 of the M1 if approaching from the North and Junction 33 of the M1 if approaching from the South. The arena has parking for around 1,200 cars which is often available to pre-book in advance at a discounted rate.

=== Tram ===
The arena is accessible via the South Yorkshire Supertram with the primary stop, Arena / Olympic Legacy Park, being served by both the Yellow route and the Tram-train. The Valley Centertainment entertainment complex nearby provides a secondary stop for the arena; this stop has Park & Ride facilities.

=== Train ===
There are 3 train stations that are connected to the arena by Supertram – Sheffield, Meadowhall Interchange and Rotherham Central – as well as nearby Darnall which is a 5-minute drive from the arena.

=== Bus ===
The arena is serviced by many bus routes (including X1 Steel Link) stopping at the Sheffield Arena and/or Arena Square stops nearby.
