= No Sound Without Silence =

2014 studio album by the Script

Studio album by the Script
- Released: 12 September 2014
- Recorded: September 2012 – 2014
- Studio: #3 World Tour Bus (various; see tour dates)
- Genre: Pop rock
- Length: 43:57
- Label: Phonogenic; Columbia
- Producer: James Barry; Andrew Frampton; Steve Kipner; Danny O'Donoghue; Mark Sheehan

The Script chronology
#3 (2012)	No Sound Without Silence (2014)	Freedom Child (2017)

Singles from No Sound Without Silence
- 1. "Superheroes" Released: 22 July 2014; 2. "No Good in Goodbye" Released: 15 October 2014; 3. "Man on a Wire" Released: 15 March 2015

No Sound Without Silence is the fourth studio album by Irish pop rock band the Script. The album was released by Columbia Records on 12 September 2014 in Ireland and other Friday-release countries and on 15 September 2014 in the United Kingdom. The album is the band's first full-length release under Columbia, after releasing their previous three studio albums under Phonogenic Records in Europe and Epic Records in the United States.

Largely recorded aboard the band's tour bus during the length of the 3 World Tour through 2012 and 2013, the album has been described as a "prequel" to the band's eponymous debut album, recorded with the ideology of creating an album better than what they had previously recorded. The album is preceded by "Superheroes", released as the lead single promoting the album on 22 July 2014.

== Background ==
In 2012, the Script released their third studio album, #3. Conceived by the band to appeal to a more mainstream audience, the album was initially released alongside mixed to negative reviews from music critics, who described the album as having been rushed and lacking artistic vision, especially in the band's venture into hip hop influences. Despite the negative reaction from critics, the album was commercially successful, achieving a hot-shot debut on the Irish Album Charts and peaking at number 2 on the UK Albums Chart.

The band's 2012 single, "Hall of Fame", became one of the band's most commercially successful singles, peaking at number one on the Irish and UK Singles Chart and reaching the top ten on sixteen national singles charts. The single was also certified Platinum in the United Kingdom by the British Phonographic Industry, 6× Platinum by ARIA in Australia, and 2× platinum in the United States by the RIAA. "Hall of Fame" also appeared on the Official Charts Company's Top 100 most downloaded tracks of all time in the United Kingdom in April 2014, placing number 89 on the overall list.

In April 2015, a special edition version of the album was released in Japan. This featured a bonus disc, containing 6 live-recorded tracks from their show in Tokyo on the NSWS tour. This included 4 back-catalogue songs ("Breakeven", "The Man Who Can't Be Moved", "For The First Time", and "Hall Of Fame") as well as 2 songs from the new album ("Superheroes", and "The Energy Never Dies").

== Recording ==
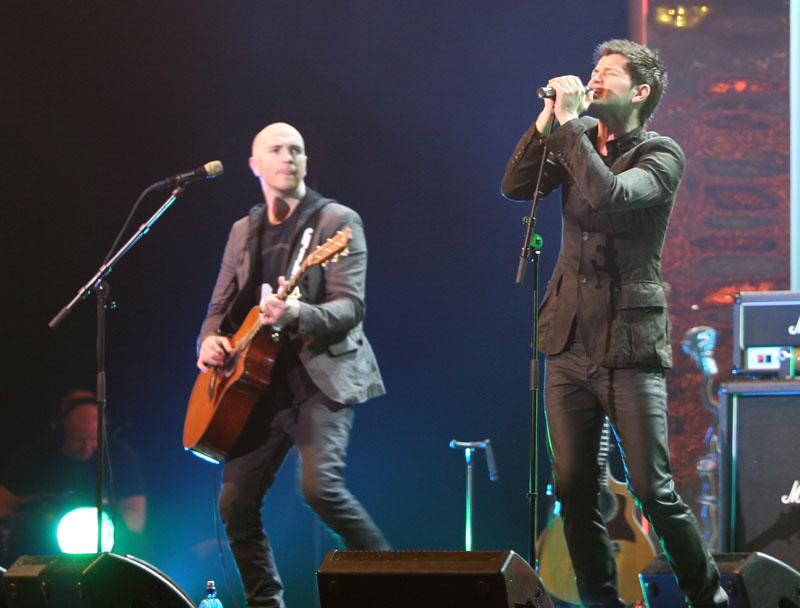
Lead singer Danny O'Donoghue (right) had given up his role as a coach on The Voice UK to focus on the recording and production of No Sound Without Silence.

Most of the material used for the band's fourth studio album was recorded on board the band's tour bus. On that bus, 40 potential tracks were written but ultimately only 11 tracks made the final cut. The 3 World Tour began in September 2012 and ended in July 2013.

O'Donoghue, in addition to touring with the band, had served as one of the four coaches for the first and second series of BBC talent show The Voice UK, having coached Andrea Begley to win the second series of the program. O'Donoghue, however, quit the programme shortly after the second series had aired to focus on the recording and production of No Sound Without Silence, stating that he was focused on the Script "moving forward" as they embarked on "the most important part of our career as a band".

== Packaging ==
The title of the album, No Sound Without Silence, is both a shortening of philosophical idea put forward by the band and a critical comment on the music industry. No Sound Without Silence is a phrase derived from an idea put forward by the band, where meaningful statements cannot be made without thinking about what you want to say first; the "silence" referring to the silence that persists while a person thinks about what they want to say, and the "sound" referring to the sounds made by people when they speak. The phrase is also a comment on the state of the music industry, where, according to the band, most artists and labels do not think critically about what they want to say, therefore, do not say meaningful things. The Script lead vocalist Danny O'Donoghue commented on the album's title, stating "The time we've been away, we've had time to contemplate about what we want to say to the industry. There is no sound without silence. You can't have anything good to say if you don't think about it first".

== Promotion ==
No Sound Without Silence was formally announced by the band and Sony on 18 July 2014. The album, its artwork and release date was unveiled through a Google Hangouts session attended by the band along with selected fans around the world. The session, which lasted a half-hour, involved the band answering questions from fans through Google+ and saw snippets from four tracks, "Superheroes", "The Energy Never Dies", "Man on a Wire" and "No Good in Goodbye", premiered live during the session. "Superheroes" was the first full track to be lifted from the album, premiering simultaneously on Capital FM and on BBC Radio 1's The Radio 1 Breakfast Show on 21 July 2014, and was released as a promotional single to United States Contemporary hit radio on 28 July 2014. "Superheroes" was also released in the United Kingdom as the band's twelfth single on 31 August 2014, serving as the first single released in promotion of No Sound Without Silence. Hail Rain or Sunshine was used in the opening scene of the 2014 Irish comedy film, Mrs. Brown's Boys D'Movie based on the sitcom Mrs. Brown's Boys.

== Critical reception ==
Professional ratings
Review scores
Source	Rating
AllMusic	4/5 stars
Digital Spy	2/5
The Guardian	1/5 stars
Irish Independent	3/5 stars
Melodic	4/5 stars
Virgin Media	2/5 stars

No Sound Without Silence received mixed reviews from music critics, though many commented that the album was a big improvement from their previous album #3.

== Track listing ==
No Sound Without Silence track listing
No.	Title	Writer(s)	Producer(s)	Length
1.	"No Good in Goodbye"	Danny O'Donoghue, Mark Sheehan, James Barry	O'Donoghue, Sheehan, Barry	5:07
2.	"Superheroes"	O'Donoghue, Sheehan, Barry	O'Donoghue, Sheehan, Barry	4:04
3.	"Man on a Wire"	O'Donoghue, Sheehan		4:05
4.	"It's Not Right for You"	O'Donoghue, Sheehan, Barry	O'Donoghue, Sheehan, Barry	4:24
5.	"The Energy Never Dies"	O'Donoghue, Sheehan, Barry, Andrew Frampton, Steve Kipner	O'Donoghue, Sheehan, Frampton, Kipner	4:15
6.	"Flares"	O'Donoghue, Sheehan, Barry, Ryan Tedder	O'Donoghue, Sheehan, Barry	3:49
7.	"Army of Angels"	O'Donoghue, Sheehan, Frampton	O'Donoghue, Sheehan, Frampton	3:58
8.	"Never Seen Anything (Quite Like You)"	O'Donoghue, Sheehan, Barry	O'Donoghue, Sheehan, Barry	3:22
9.	"Paint the Town Green"	O'Donoghue, Sheehan, Barry	O'Donoghue, Sheehan, Barry	3:31
10.	"Without Those Songs"	O'Donoghue, Sheehan, Barry	O'Donoghue, Sheehan, Barry	3:46
11.	"Hail Rain or Sunshine"	O'Donoghue, Sheehan, Barry	O'Donoghue, Sheehan, Barry	3:27
Total length:				43:57

No Sound Without Silence (iTunes Pre-order)
No.	Title	Writer(s)	Length
12.	"Howl at the Moon"	O'Donoghue, Sheehan	5:13
Total length:			49:10

== Personnel ==
The Script

- Danny O'Donoghue – lead vocals, keyboard, guitar
- Mark Sheehan – lead guitar, backing vocals, co-lead vocals on "Superheroes"
- Glen Power – drums, backing vocals

Additional musicians

- Andrew Frampton – guitar ("Superheroes")
- Ben Sargeant – bass guitar ("The Energy Never Dies")
- Ben Sargeant – bass guitar ("Without Those Songs")

Technical personnel

- James Barry – producer ("Superheroes")
- Andrew Frampton – producer, programmer ("Superheroes")
- Michael Heffernan – recording ("Superheroes")
- Ted Jensen – mastering ("Superheroes")
- Mark Stent – mixing engineer ("Superheroes")
- Geoff Swan – assistant engineer ("Superheroes")
- Fergal Toohey – recording, assistant producer, assistant engineer ("Superheroes")

== Charts ==
=== Weekly charts ===
Weekly chart performance for No Sound Without Silence
Chart (2014–2015)	Peak position
Australian Albums (ARIA)	5
Austrian Albums (Ö3 Austria)	11
Belgian Albums (Ultratop Flanders)	14
Belgian Albums (Ultratop Wallonia)	37
Canadian Albums (Billboard)	13
Danish Albums (Hitlisten)	11
Dutch Albums (Album Top 100)	3
Finnish Albums (Suomen virallinen lista)	46
French Albums (SNEP)	79
German Albums (Offizielle Top 100)	12
Irish Albums (IRMA)	1
Italian Albums (FIMI)	15
New Zealand Albums (RMNZ)	1
Norwegian Albums (VG-lista)	7
Portuguese Albums (AFP)	10
Scottish Albums (OCC)	1
Spanish Albums (PROMUSICAE)	25
Swedish Albums (Sverigetopplistan)	17
Swiss Albums (Schweizer Hitparade)	2
UK Albums (OCC)	1
US Billboard 200	10

=== Year-end charts ===
Year-end chart performance for No Sound Without Silence
Chart (2014)	Position
Australian Albums (ARIA)	82
Belgian Albums (Ultratop Flanders)	170
Dutch Albums (Album Top 100)	60
UK Albums (OCC)	21
Chart (2015)	Position
Dutch Albums (Album Top 100)	78
New Zealand Albums (RMNZ)	11

== Certifications ==
Certifications for No Sound Without Silence
Region	Certification	Certified units/sales
Australia (ARIA)	Gold	35,000^{^}
Denmark (IFPI Danmark)	Gold	10,000^{‡}
Netherlands (NVPI)	Gold	20,000^{^}
New Zealand (RMNZ)	2× Platinum	30,000^{‡}
United Kingdom (BPI)	Platinum	350,098
^{^} Shipments figures based on certification alone.^{‡} Sales+streaming figures based on certification alone.

== Release history ==
Release history and formats for No Sound Without Silence
Region	Date	Format	Label
Germany	12 September 2014	CD; digital download	Columbia
Ireland	12 September 2014	CD; digital download	Columbia
United Kingdom	15 September 2014	CD; digital download	Columbia
United States	30 September 2014	CD; digital download	Columbia
