= Freedom Child =

Studio album by The Script
- Released: 1 September 2017
- Recorded: 2016–2017
- Genres: Pop rock; pop; R&B; dance
- Length: 48:56
- Labels: Columbia; Sony

The Script chronology
No Sound Without Silence (2014)	Freedom Child (2017)	Acoustic Sessions (2018)

Singles from Freedom Child
- 1. "Rain" Released: 14 July 2017; 2. "Arms Open" Released: 13 November 2017

Freedom Child is the fifth studio album by Irish rock band The Script. It was released via Columbia Records and Sony Music on 1 September 2017.

== Background ==
Speaking about how pop music has turned out since The Script went on a hiatus after their last album No Sound Without Silence, Danny O’Donoghue said "If you take a listen to radio now, there aren’t too many bands - guitar, bass, drums, vocals. Everyone has some kind of production element." The album was announced as members of the band took time out with their families in Ireland after four studio albums since 2008.

"Rain" was released as the first single from the album and their first new song since 2014.

Explaining how the album title was decided, O'Donoghue said "It came from Mark's side... His seven-year-old came up to him one day and asked, 'Dad, what's terrorism?'" The album title was inspired by its song of the same name, which addresses terrorism and the need for harmony. He also mentioned how the album covers many topics.

"Divided States of America", a song on the album was explained by O’Donoghue, who said "We were in America when Trump's [2017] inauguration was happening, and you couldn’t walk down the street without seeing how divided America was. The guy selling cigarettes could be a Democrat and the guy he's selling them to could be a Trump supporter."

== Critical reception ==
Professional ratings
Review scores
Source	Rating
AllMusic	4/5 stars
The Irish Times	2/5 stars
The Last Mixed Tape	2/10
London Evening Standard	2/5 stars
Raidió Teilifís Éireann	2/5 stars

Matt Collar of AllMusic gave the album a positive review, stating that the album "is a vibrant, immediately engaging effort that finds them nicely balancing their various influences, from slick dance-pop to kinetic R&B and thoughtful, crowd-pleasing anthems." Eleanor of Live Arena also gave the album a positive review but with no score, stating that "the group's confident new sound, that strays away from the rock feel we're used to, strikes listeners with positivity and strength. It's worth a listen."

The album has had several negative reviews, including from Lauren Murphy of The Irish Times, who stated that "it's too long, but more importantly, it's emotionally hollow." Rick Pearson of London Evening Standard also gave the album a negative review, and said that "Truly, the road to musical hell is paved with good intentions." Stephen White of The Last Mixed Tape gave the album a score of 2 out of 10, calling the album "an advert that will top the charts".

== Track listing ==
Freedom Child track listing
No.	Title	Writer(s)	Producer(s)	Length
1.	"No Man Is an Island"	Mark Sheehan; Camille Purcell; Daniel O'Donoghue; James "Jimbo" Barry	The Script; Jimbo; OzGo	3:49
2.	"Rain"	O'Donoghue; Purcell; Sheehan; Barry	The Script; Jimbo; Andrew Frampton; Max Farrar	3:29
3.	"Arms Open"	Sheehan; Adam Messinger; O'Donoghue; Nasri Atweh	The Messengers	4:00
4.	"Rock the World"	Sheehan; O'Donoghue; Andrew Frampton; Steve Kipner; Barry	The Script; Jimbo; Frampton; Kipner	3:10
5.	"Mad Love"	Sheehan; Frampton; O'Donoghue; Kipner	The Script; Frampton; Kipner; Farrar^{[a]}	3:25
6.	"Deliverance"	Sheehan; Oscar Görres; O'Donoghue; James Alan Ghaleb	OzGo	3:31
7.	"Divided States of America"	Sheehan; O'Donoghue; Barry	The Script; Jimbo; Frampton^{[c]}	4:04
8.	"Wonders"	Sheehan; Toby Gad; O'Donoghue	Gad; Frampton; Farrar	4:18
9.	"Love Not Lovers"	Sheehan; Frampton; O'Donoghue; Kipner	The Script; Frampton; Farrar; Kipner	3:44
10.	"Eden"	Sheehan; O'Donoghue; Gad; Clarence Coffee Jr.	The Script; Jimbo; Gad; Frampton	3:29
11.	"Make Up"	Sheehan; O'Donoghue; Barry	The Script; Jimbo; Frampton	3:26
12.	"Written in the Scars"	Sheehan; Frampton; O'Donoghue; Max Farrar; Kipner	Frampton; Farrar; Kipner	3:47
13.	"Awakening"	Sheehan; O'Donoghue	The Script; Jimbo	0:47
14.	"Freedom Child"	Sheehan; O'Donoghue; Barry	The Script; Jimbo; Frampton	3:57
Total length:				48:56

Notes

- ^{^[a]} signifies a co-producer.
- ^{^[c]} signifies a vocal producer.

== Charts ==
=== Weekly charts ===
Weekly chart performance for Freedom Child
Chart (2017)	Peak position
Australian Albums (ARIA)	5
Austrian Albums (Ö3 Austria)	61
Belgian Albums (Ultratop Flanders)	13
Belgian Albums (Ultratop Wallonia)	40
Canadian Albums (Billboard)	62
Czech Albums (ČNS IFPI)	91
Danish Albums (Hitlisten)	26
Dutch Albums (Album Top 100)	3
Finnish Albums (Suomen virallinen lista)	31
French Albums (SNEP)	140
German Albums (Offizielle Top 100)	43
Irish Albums (IRMA)	1
Italian Albums (FIMI)	35
New Zealand Albums (RMNZ)	17
Norwegian Albums (VG-lista)	6
Portuguese Albums (AFP)	19
Scottish Albums (Official Charts)	1
Spanish Albums (Promusicae)	37
Swedish Albums (Sverigetopplistan)	27
Swiss Albums (Schweizer Hitparade)	10
UK Albums (Official Charts)	1
US Billboard 200	58

=== Year-end charts ===
Year-end chart performance for Freedom Child
Chart (2017)	Position
Dutch Albums (MegaCharts)	95
UK Albums (OCC)	83

== Certifications ==
Certifications for Freedom Child
Region	Certification	Certified units/sales
United Kingdom (BPI)	Gold	100,000^{‡}
^{‡} Sales+streaming figures based on certification alone.
