= If You Could See Me Now (The Script song) =

Single by the Script

from the album #3
- Released: 4 March 2013
- Recorded: 2011–12
- Genre: Pop rock; hip hop
- Length: 3:39
- Label: Phonogenic
- Songwriter(s): Danny O'Donoghue; Mark Sheehan; Steve Kipner; Andrew Frampton
- Producer(s): Steve Kipner; Andrew Frampton

The Script singles chronology
"Six Degrees of Separation" (2012)	"If You Could See Me Now" (2013)	"Millionaires" (2013)

"If You Could See Me Now" is a song by Irish pop rock band the Script, taken from their third studio album, #3 (2012). A music video was released on 18 February 2013. The song was released as the album's third single on 4 March 2013. It was written by Danny O'Donoghue, Mark Sheehan, Steve Kipner and Andrew Frampton.

== Background ==
The song addresses the death of Danny O'Donoghue's father and both Mark Sheehan's parents.

Following Sheehan's death in 2023, the Script dedicated the song to him during a performance in Bolton.

== Music video ==
A music video to accompany the release of "If You Could See Me Now" was first released onto YouTube on 18 February 2013 at a total length of three minutes and forty-nine seconds.

== Live performances ==
On 25 January 2013 they performed the song live on The Graham Norton Show. They also performed the single on "Let's Dance for Sport Relief".

== Track listing ==
Digital download
No.	Title	Length
1.	"If You Could See Me Now"	3:39

== Charts ==
=== Charts ===
Weekly chart performance for "If You Could See Me Now"
Chart (2013)	Peak position
Australia (ARIA)	34
Austria (Ö3 Austria Top 40)	16
Belgium (Ultratip Bubbling Under Flanders)	2
Czech Republic (Rádio – Top 100)	5
Germany (GfK)	45
Ireland (IRMA)	13
Netherlands (Dutch Top 40)	21
Netherlands (Single Top 100)	27
New Zealand (Recorded Music NZ)	11
Scotland (OCC)	11
Slovakia (Rádio Top 100)	5
UK Singles (OCC)	20
Ukraine Airplay (TopHit)	71

=== Year-end charts ===
Year-end chart performance for "If You Could See Me Now"
Chart (2013)	Position
Netherlands (Dutch Top 40)	96
UK Singles (Official Charts Company)	117
Ukraine Airplay (TopHit)	100

== Certifications ==
Certifications for "If You Could See Me Now"
Region	Certification	Certified units/sales
Australia (ARIA)	Platinum	70,000^{‡}
New Zealand (RMNZ)	Platinum	15,000^{*}
United Kingdom (BPI)	Gold	400,000^{‡}
Streaming
Denmark (IFPI Danmark)	Platinum	1,800,000^{†}
^{*} Sales figures based on certification alone.^{‡} Sales+streaming figures based on certification alone.^{†} Streaming-only figures based on certification alone.

== Release history ==
Release history for "If You Could See Me Now"
Region	Date	Format	Label
United Kingdom	4 March 2013	Digital download	Phonogenic
