= No Good in Goodbye =

Single by the Script

from the album No Sound Without Silence
- Released: 15 October 2014
- Recorded: 2013–14
- Genre: Pop rock
- Length: 5:07 (album version); 3:57 (radio edit)
- Label: Columbia
- Songwriters: James Barry; Danny O'Donoghue; Mark Sheehan
- Producers: James Barry; Danny O'Donoghue; Mark Sheehan

The Script singles chronology
"Superheroes" (2014)	"No Good in Goodbye" (2014)	"Man on a Wire" (2015)

"No Good in Goodbye" is a song by Irish rock band the Script. It was released on 15 October 2014 as the second single from their fourth studio album No Sound Without Silence (2014).

According to the Script vocalist Danny O'Donoghue, the band's material is made up of complex thoughts condensed down to really simple songs. He explained that with this track, "we wanted to put a twist on a word: where's the good in goodbye, where's the fair in farewell... Then we tried to make that into a lyrical idea, which seemed to work really well."

== Charts ==
=== Weekly charts ===
Chart (2014–15)	Peak position
Australia (ARIA)	93
Belgium (Ultratip Bubbling Under Flanders)	3
Denmark Airplay (Tracklisten)	14
Hungary (Rádiós Top 40)	10
Ireland (IRMA)	62
Netherlands (Dutch Top 40)	35
Netherlands (Single Top 100)	77
Switzerland (Schweizer Hitparade)	69
UK Singles (Official Charts)	26
US Adult Pop Airplay (Billboard)	24

=== Year-end charts ===
Chart (2015)	Position
Hungary (Rádiós Top 40)	80

== Certifications ==
Region	Certification	Certified units/sales
United Kingdom (BPI)	Silver	200,000^{‡}
^{‡} Sales+streaming figures based on certification alone.
