= Colton Avery =

American singer-songwriter

Colton Avery is a singer-songwriter from Phoenix, Arizona. His songwriting credits include Far East Movement, Alan Walker, Au/Ra and Alex Aiono.

== Waves (2012–2014) ==
Avery's first studio album, titled Waves, was released on March 13, 2012, under BridgeTone Records. The album includes 12 tracks: "Superfly", "Live Easy", "Deeper Down", "Thieves", "Skyline Drive", "Hold On (You've Got To)", "Reflections of the Sun", "Cinderella", "Waves", "Anna", "Almost Home", and "To the Ocean". On March 17, 2014, just over two years after the release of Waves, his song "Cinderella" from the album was featured on the ABC Family show Switched at Birth in the season three episode "The Ambush". The episode was watched by 1.18 million viewers the night of its premiere.

== Touring with The Script, and three new songs (2015) ==
As Avery built a following in the southwest US, the popular Irish band The Script, known for songs such as "The Man Who Can't Be Moved", "Breakeven", Nothing", "Hall of Fame", and "Superheroes", caught notice and invited him to open for them during their No Sound Without Silence Tour. He and the band traveled through Europe, North America, Australia, the Philippines, Thailand, and Malaysia throughout the year of 2015. His biggest show to date was opening for the band at Croke Park in Dublin on June 20, 2015, where he played to 74,635 people. During the tour, Avery collaborated with The Script on his song titled "Weatherman". He also wrote songs titled "Murder" and "The One". All three songs have live acoustic versions that are available on SoundCloud, along with a studio version of "Murder".

== Ground Zero (2016–2018) ==
On June 29, 2016, Colton Avery shared a new song titled "Beg, Steal, Borrow". Later that year, on October 7, 2016, Avery was featured in Nicky Romero's song "Take Me". Just over a year later, on October 13, 2017, Avery released a new single titled "Religion”. On January 3, 2018, he announced that he was now being managed by the Cherrytree Music Company. On February 16, 2018 Avery was featured as the vocalist and songwriter on RAMI’s single “Fireproof” featuring CASP;R. June 1, 2018, he released the third single off the album, "Ground Zero".

== Far Too Long (2019–present) ==
Colton's released "Far Too Long" in 2019. He was also featured on the single "Always On Your Mind" with Paige, which was released on Armada Music in 2019.
