= 3 (The Script album) =

#3

Studio album by the Script
- Released: 7 September 2012
- Recorded: 2011–2012
- Genres: Pop rock; Hip-hop
- Length: 39:57
- Label: Phonogenic
- Producers: Danny O'Donoghue; Mark Sheehan

The Script chronology
Science & Faith (2010)	#3 (2012)	No Sound Without Silence (2014)

Singles from #3
- 1. "Hall of Fame" Released: 20 August 2012; 2. "Six Degrees of Separation" Released: 25 November 2012; 3. "If You Could See Me Now" Released: 4 March 2013; 4. "Millionaires" Released: 13 June 2013

#3 is the third studio album released by Irish pop rock trio, the Script. The album was released in Ireland on 7 September 2012, in the United Kingdom on 10 September and in the United States on 9 October. The album was preceded by the release of the single "Hall of Fame", a duet with will.i.am, who was, at the time, lead singer Danny O'Donoghue's co-judge on The Voice UK. The album reached number one in Ireland, number two in the UK, and number 13 in the US, but received generally unfavourable reviews.

== Background ==
The band announced via their official Twitter account on 2 June 2012 that recording of their third studio album was complete, and that the title of the album would be #3. They also stated that the album was due for release on 17 September 2012; however, a later announcement brought the release date forward by a week to 10 September. O'Donoghue revealed on 8 July that the title of the lead single would be "Hall of Fame", and that the track would debut on radio on 23 July and would be available for digital download on 19 August. He also stated that the track was recorded in Los Angeles and features vocals from O'Donoghue's close friend and fellow The Voice UK coach will.i.am.

The band recorded most of the album in London's Sphere Studios, working once again with longtime collaborators Andrew Frampton and Steve Kipner. The album's track listing was confirmed by Digital Spy on 8 August 2012. The deluxe edition of the album contains a bonus disc, containing two previously unreleased tracks, four live tracks and two alternative versions of "Hall of Fame", the second of which is a hidden track. Digital Spy also revealed the album's artwork on the same date.

Professional ratings
Aggregate scores
Source	Rating
Metacritic	38/100
Review scores
Source	Rating
AllMusic	3/5 stars
The Guardian	2/5 stars
Sputnikmusic	1/5

== Critical reception ==
#3 received generally negative reviews from critics. At Metacritic, which assigns a normalised rating out of 100 to reviews from mainstream critics, the album received an average score of 38, based on six reviews, which indicates "generally unfavorable reviews". The Guardian's Caroline Sullivan found the album bland and was not impressed with O'Donoghue's rapping on some of the tracks. AllMusic was slightly more generous giving the album three stars out of five and saying that the slickly produced album "should appeal to the Script's longtime fans, as well as any casual listener of heartfelt mainstream music". All reviewers, however, complimented Donoghue's lyric-writing abilities, referring to him as an "emotional storyteller" and to the lyrics as relatable and poignant, especially on 'If You Could See Me Now', which addresses both Donoghue's and guitarist and songwriter Mark Sheehan's grief following the death of their parents.

== Singles ==
- "Hall of Fame" was released as the album's lead single on 17 August 2012, in Ireland. The track features vocals from American rapper, singer and songwriter will.i.am. The track received its first radio play on 23 July 2012, and a lyric video for the track was released the same day. The song also became the band's first UK Singles Chart number-one single on 16 September 2012. The single was backed with a remix created by song co-writer Jimbo Barry. The single was physically released in Germany on 11 January 2013.
- "Six Degrees of Separation" was released as the album's second single released on 26 November 2012. The music video for the track premiered on 10 November and the band promoted the single through a performance on BBC's Children in Need. However, the single was not released as a stand-alone release on the iTunes Store, was not backed with any B-sides or remixes, and thus, only peaked at number 32 on the UK Singles Chart, becoming one of the band's lowest performing singles to date.
- "If You Could See Me Now" was released as the album's third single and peaked at number 13 on the UK Singles Chart; it is about Danny and Mark's experiences losing their parents and questioning whether they would be proud of what they've achieved.
- "Millionaires" was the fourth single from the album. It had already received decent airplay before it was released, joining BBC Radio 2's playlist and the band performed it live at BBC Radio 1's Big Weekend in Derry on 26 May 2013. It was shown in the highlights of the concert on BBC Three later in the day. The music video for the single was released on 12 June 2013.

== Track listing ==
No.	Title	Writer(s)	Producer(s)	Length
1.	"Good Ol' Days"	O'Donoghue, Sheehan, Ben Sargeant	Sheehan	4:23
2.	"Six Degrees of Separation"	O'Donoghue, Sheehan, Kipner, Frampton	Kipner, Frampton	3:52
3.	"Hall of Fame" (featuring will.i.am)	O'Donoghue, Sheehan, Jimbo Barry	O'Donoghue, Sheehan, Jimbo Barry	3:22
4.	"If You Could See Me Now"	O'Donoghue, Sheehan, Kipner, Frampton	Kipner, Frampton	3:39
5.	"Glowing"	O'Donoghue, Sheehan, Barry	Sheehan	4:46
6.	"Give the Love Around"	O'Donoghue, Sheehan	Sheehan	4:24
7.	"Broken Arrow"	O'Donoghue, Sheehan	Sheehan	4:34
8.	"Kaleidoscope"	O'Donoghue, Sheehan	Sheehan	3:41
9.	"No Words"	O'Donoghue, Sheehan, Barry	Sheehan	4:05
10.	"Millionaires"	O'Donoghue, Sheehan, Kipner, Frampton	Kipner, Frampton	3:11
Total length:				39:57

Deluxe edition bonus disc
No.	Title	Writer(s)	Producer(s)	Length
11.	"Moon Boots"	O'Donoghue, Sheehan	Sheehan	4:11
12.	"Hurricanes"	O'Donoghue, Sheehan	Sheehan	4:40
13.	"Hall of Fame" (original version)	O'Donoghue, Sheehan, Barry	Sheehan	3:23
14.	"Breakeven" (live at the Aviva Stadium, Dublin)	O'Donoghue, Sheehan, Kipner, Frampton	Kipner, Frampton	5:38
15.	"The Man Who Can't Be Moved" (live at the Aviva Stadium, Dublin)	O'Donoghue, Sheehan, Kipner, Frampton	Kipner, Frampton	4:55
16.	"Talk You Down" (live at the Aviva Stadium, Dublin)	O'Donoghue, Sheehan, Kipner, Frampton	Kipner, Frampton	4:58
17.	"For the First Time" (live at the Aviva Stadium, Dublin)	O'Donoghue, Sheehan	Sheehan	5:04
18.	"Making of #3" (video)			11:41
Total length:				1:12:28

== Charts ==
=== Weekly charts ===
Weekly chart performance for #3
Chart (2012)	Peak position
Australian Albums (ARIA)	9
Austrian Albums (Ö3 Austria)	18
Belgian Albums (Ultratop Flanders)	43
Belgian Albums (Ultratop Wallonia)	50
Danish Albums (Hitlisten)	32
Dutch Albums (Album Top 100)	8
French Albums (SNEP)	173
German Albums (Offizielle Top 100)	11
Irish Albums (IRMA)	1
Italian Albums (FIMI)	17
New Zealand Albums (RMNZ)	11
Norwegian Albums (VG-lista)	13
Portuguese Albums (AFP)	28
Scottish Albums (Official Charts)	1
Spanish Albums (Promusicae)	55
Swedish Albums (Sverigetopplistan)	59
Swiss Albums (Schweizer Hitparade)	4
UK Albums (Official Charts)	2
US Billboard 200	13

=== Year-end charts ===
2012 year-end chart performance for #3
Chart (2012)	Position
Australian Albums (ARIA)	80
Irish Albums (IRMA)	14
UK Albums (OCC)	22

2013 year-end chart performance for #3
Chart (2013)	Position
Belgian Albums (Ultratop Flanders)	166
Dutch Albums (Album Top 100)	99
UK Albums (OCC)	57

== Certifications and sales ==
Certifications and sales for #3
Region	Certification	Certified units/sales
Australia (ARIA)	Gold	35,000^{^}
Denmark (IFPI Danmark)	Gold	10,000^{‡}
Ireland (IRMA)	Platinum	15,000^{^}
New Zealand (RMNZ)	4× Platinum	60,000^{‡}
Philippines (PARI)	Gold	7,500^{*}
Singapore (RIAS)	Gold	5,000^{*}
Sweden (GLF)	Gold	20,000^{‡}
United Kingdom (BPI)	2× Platinum	813,100
^{*} Sales figures based on certification alone.^{^} Shipments figures based on certification alone.^{‡} Sales+streaming figures based on certification alone.
