= Superheroes (song) =

Single by The Script

from the album No Sound Without Silence
- Released: 22 July 2014
- Recorded: 2014
- Genre: Pop rock
- Length: 4:03
- Label: Columbia
- Songwriters: James Barry; Danny O'Donoghue; Mark Sheehan
- Producers: James Barry; Danny O'Donoghue; Andrew Frampton; Mark Sheehan

The Script singles chronology
"Millionaires" (2013)	"Superheroes" (2014)	"No Good in Goodbye" (2014)

Music video
- "Superheroes" on YouTube

"Superheroes" is a song written by Danny O'Donoghue and Mark Sheehan of Irish pop rock band the Script with songwriter James Barry. The song was originally recorded by the band for inclusion and it is the lead single on their fourth studio album, No Sound Without Silence (2014).

The track was first released by Columbia Records on 22 July 2014 as the lead single promoting the album. The single was released in Ireland and the United Kingdom on 29 August and 31 August 2014, respectively.

== Composition ==
According to the Script lead vocalist Danny O'Donoghue, "Superheroes" is a song written for "the unsung heroes out in the world". The song, which calls out "people who are going through the hardest of times but can keep their head held high", has drawn comparisons by some music critics to "Firework", originally performed by American singer Katy Perry, in terms of the song's lyrical themes.

== Recording ==
"Superheroes" was the first song written by the band for their fourth studio album, setting a musical template for the production of the new album. The track also features additional guitar played by producer Andrew Frampton, a long-time collaborator with The Script.

== Promotion ==
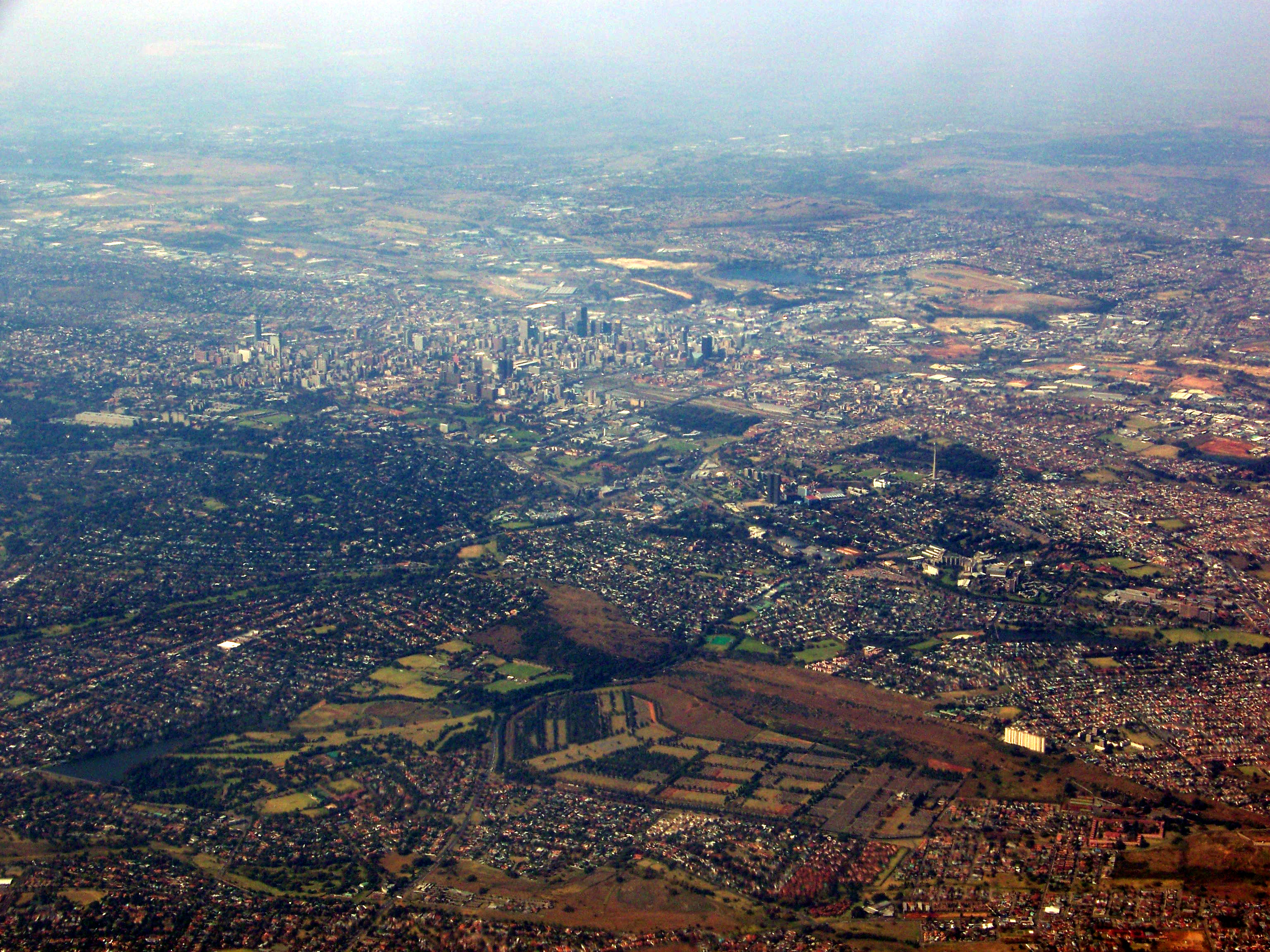
The music video for "Superheroes" was shot in Johannesburg, South Africa, cited by the band as an inspiration for the song itself.

A snippet of "Superheroes" was first played during a Google Hangouts session hosted by the band on 18 July 2014, where they unveiled their fourth studio album, No Sound Without Silence. The snippet was one of four to be played during the session, with snippets from No Sound Without Silence album tracks "The Energy Never Dies", "Man On a Wire", and "No Good In Goodbye" also being played during the session. "Superheroes" was the first full track to be lifted from the album, premiering on BBC Radio 1 during The Radio 1 Breakfast Show on 21 July 2014. The track was also set to be released as a promotional single for airplay on United States Contemporary hit radio on 28 July 2014. "Superheroes" was first released as the sole track on the band's twelfth single on 22 July 2014, serving as the first single released in promotion of No Sound Without Silence. The track was additionally distributed by video hosting service Vevo for streaming media the same day.

=== Music video ===
A music video to accompany the release of "Superheroes" directed by Vaughan Arnell was released on 4 August 2014. The music video was shot in Johannesburg, South Africa over a period of a few days. The location of the video's principal photography was inspired by the song itself, with Danny O'Donoghue stating that, "We spent a few days there and spent a lot of time with the people in the township, because they are our superheroes".

== Reception ==
Reception to the song upon the release of the "Superheroes" single has been generally positive. National American daily newspaper USA Today named the track as "song of the week" on 22 July 2014, with music critic Brian Mansfield writing "The Script continues to display its biggest strength: making pop music with heart and power". Rachel Sonis of music website Idolator wrote "Superheroes is a self-proclaimed "ultra-catchy" tune that, after a few spins, definitely lives up to that description". Kevin, editor-in-chief of Spin Media website Direct Lyrics commented positively on the song, stating "there is no way The Script aren't reaching #1 with this", further describing it as "epic in every way".

Reactions to the song on social media was also largely positive, with Capital reporting that fans had "hailed" the track as "beautiful" upon the track's first play on its radio network. In addition, 4Music stated that the song was an "anthemic" "stomper".

== Track listing ==
"Superheroes"
No.	Title	Writer(s)	Producer(s)	Length
1.	"Superheroes"	James Barry, Danny O'Donoghue, Mark Sheehan	Barry, O'Donoghue, Andrew Frampton, Sheehan	4:03

== Personnel ==
Adapted from "Superheroes" liner notes.

The Script

- Danny O'Donoghue – lead vocals, keyboard, guitar
- Mark Sheehan – lead guitar, vocals (bridge)
- Glen Power – drums, backing vocals

Additional musicians

- Andrew Frampton - guitar

Technical personnel

- James Barry - producer
- Andrew Frampton - producer, programmer
- Michael Heffernan - recording
- Ted Jensen - mastering
- Mark Stent - mixing engineer
- Geoff Swan - assistant engineer
- Fergal Toohey - recording, assistant producer, assistant engineer

== Charts ==
=== Weekly charts ===
Chart (2014–15)	Peak position
Australia (ARIA)	7
Austria (Ö3 Austria Top 40)	9
Belgium (Ultratip Bubbling Under Flanders)	2
Belgium (Ultratip Bubbling Under Wallonia)	5
Canada AC (Billboard)	30
CIS Airplay (TopHit)	7
Czech Republic Airplay (ČNS IFPI)	13
Czech Republic Singles Digital (ČNS IFPI)	11
Denmark (Tracklisten)	18
Finland (Suomen virallinen lista)	12
France (SNEP)	104
Germany (GfK)	8
Germany (Airplay Chart)	1
Hungary (Rádiós Top 40)	10
Hungary (Single Top 40)	40
Ireland (IRMA)	1
Japan Hot 100 (Billboard)	15
Netherlands (Dutch Top 40)	4
Netherlands (Single Top 100)	10
New Zealand (Recorded Music NZ)	14
Poland Airplay (ZPAV)	14
Russia Airplay (TopHit)	9
Scotland Singles (OCC)	1
Slovakia Airplay (ČNS IFPI)	6
Slovakia Singles Digital (ČNS IFPI)	31
Slovenia (SloTop50)	8
Spain (Promusicae)	47
South Africa (EMA)	4
Sweden (Sverigetopplistan)	18
Switzerland (Schweizer Hitparade)	8
UK Singles (OCC)	3
Ukraine Airplay (TopHit)	6
US Billboard Hot 100	73
US Adult Contemporary (Billboard)	18
US Adult Pop Airplay (Billboard)	9

=== Year-end charts ===
Chart (2014)	Position
Australia (ARIA)	68
Germany (Official German Charts)	75
Hungary (Rádiós Top 40)	67
Netherlands (Dutch Top 40)	17
Netherlands (Single Top 100)	34
Russia Airplay (TopHit)	52
Ukraine Airplay (TopHit)	155
United Kingdom (BPI)	54
US Adult Top 40 (Billboard)	38
Chart (2015)	Position
Slovenia (SloTop50)	29

== Certifications ==
Region	Certification	Certified units/sales
Australia (ARIA)	3× Platinum	210,000^{‡}
Denmark (IFPI Danmark)	Platinum	60,000^{^}
Germany (BVMI)	Platinum	400,000^{‡}
Italy (FIMI)	Platinum	50,000^{‡}
New Zealand (RMNZ)	2× Platinum	60,000^{‡}
Spain (Promusicae)	Gold	30,000^{‡}
Sweden (GLF)	Platinum	40,000^{‡}
United Kingdom (BPI)	2× Platinum	1,200,000^{‡}
United States (RIAA)	Gold	500,000^{‡}
Streaming
Denmark (IFPI Danmark)	Gold	1,300,000^{†}
^{^} Shipments figures based on certification alone.^{‡} Sales+streaming figures based on certification alone.^{†} Streaming-only figures based on certification alone.

== Release history ==
=== Commercial ===
Country	Date	Format	Label
Australia	22 July 2014	Digital download	Columbia Records
France	22 July 2014	Digital download	Columbia Records
United States	28 July 2014	Digital download	Columbia Records
Ireland	29 August 2014	Digital download	Columbia Records
United Kingdom	31 August 2014	Digital download	Columbia Records

=== Promotional ===
Country	Date	Radio format	Label
United States	28 July 2014	Hot AC radio	Columbia Records
United States	4 November 2014	Contemporary hit radio	Columbia Records
