= List of events at the 3Arena =

The 3Arena is an indoor amphitheatre located beside the river Liffey at North Wall Quay in the Dublin Docklands in Dublin, Ireland. It was built on the site of the former Point Theatre, a smaller music venue which operated from 1988 to 2007, retaining only some of the outer facade preserved from its original role as a railway goods handling station. The venue opened on 16 December 2008, and was known as the O_{2} until 4 September 2014, when it was rebranded as the 3Arena, due to the takeover of the telecommunications company O2 Ireland by Three Ireland.

Since opening the venue has been host to some of the world's best known music, comedy, and other acts. Below is a list of performers that have performed at the venue.

== Music performances ==
Event/Artist/Band	Dates	Tour / Notes	Opening Act
The Pussycat Dolls	1 February 2009	Doll Domination Tour	
AC/DC	18 April 2009	Black Ice World Tour	
Bob Dylan	5–6 May 2009	Never Ending Tour 2009	
Britney Spears	19 and 20 June 2009	Circus Tour	
Beyoncé	29 May–23 November 2009	I Am... World Tour	
Def Leppard	12 June 2009	With Whitesnake & Journey	
Leonard Cohen	19–23 July 2009	Leonard Cohen Tour 2008–2010	
Green Day	21 October 2009	21st Century Breakdown World Tour	
Fleetwood Mac	24–25 October 2009	Unleashed Tour	
Muse	6 November 2009	The Resistance Tour	
Backstreet Boys	13 November 2009	This Is Us Tour	
Arctic Monkeys	26 November 2009	Humbug Tour	
Lily Allen	8 December 2009	It's Not Me, It's You World Tour	
Depeche Mode	10 December 2009	Tour of the Universe	
Miley Cyrus	16–17 December 2009	Wonder World Tour	Metro Station
Lady Gaga	20–21 February 2010	The Monster Ball Tour	Alphabeat; Semi Precious Weapons
Thirty Seconds to Mars	26 February 2010	Into the Wild Tour	
The Black Eyed Peas	1–2 May 2010	The E.N.D. World Tour	
Kiss	7 May 2010	Sonic Boom Over Europe Tour	
Rod Stewart	11 May–31 July 2010	Soulbook Tour	
Rage Against the Machine	8 June 2010	Rage Against the Machine Reunion Tour	
Pearl Jam	22 June 2010	Backspacer Tour	
Iron Maiden	30 July 2010	The Final Frontier World Tour	
Blink-182	31 August 2010	Blink-182 in Concert	
Guns N' Roses	1 September 2010	Chinese Democracy Tour	
Gorillaz	11 November 2010	Escape to Plastic Beach Tour	Little Dragon; De La Soul
Shakira	16 December 2010	The Sun Comes Out World Tour	
My Chemical Romance	16 February 2011	The World Contamination Tour	
The Script	10–12 March 2011	Science & Faith Tour	
Kylie Minogue	22–23 March 2011	Aphrodite: Les Folies Tour	
Sade	25 March 2011	Sade Live	
Taylor Swift	27 March 2011	Speak Now World Tour	Ryan Sheridan
Katy Perry	28 March 2011	California Dreams Tour	DJ Skeet Skeet
Westlife	2–10 April 2011	Gravity Tour	
Rush	12 May 2011	Time Machine Tour	
Roger Waters	23–24 May 2011	The Wall Live (2010-2013)	
Def Leppard	8 June 2011	Mirror Ball Tour	
Journey	11 June 2011	Eclipse Tour	
Dolly Parton	14 September 2011	Better Day World Tour	
Rihanna	3 October–25 November 2011	Loud Tour	Calvin Harris
Bob Dylan	6 October 2011	Never Ending Tour 2011	
Britney Spears	24 October 2011	Femme Fatale Tour	Joe Jonas; Destinee & Paris
Red Hot Chili Peppers	4 November 2011	I'm With You World Tour	
The Saturdays	19 December 2011	All Fired Up!	
Snow Patrol	20–21 January 2012	Fallen Empires Tour	
One Direction	24 January 2012	Up All Night Tour	
Rammstein	27 February 2012	Made in Germany 1995–2011	
Florence + The Machine	2 March–12 December 2012	Ceremonials Tour	
Backstreet Boys and New Kids on the Block	21 April 2012	NKOTBSB Tour	
Guns N' Roses	17 May 2012	Up Close and Personal Tour	
Jay-Z and Kanye West	8–9 June 2012	Watch the Throne Tour	
Blink-182	12 June 2012	20th Anniversary Tour	
Roxette	9 July 2012	The Neverending World Tour	
Jennifer Lopez	19 October 2012	Dance Again World Tour	
Muse	3 November 2012	The 2nd Law World Tour	
Two Door Cinema Club	19 January 2013	Beacon World Tour	
Justin Bieber	17–18 February 2013	Believe Tour	
The Script	28 February–2 March 2013	3 World Tour	
One Direction	5–13 March 2013	Take Me Home Tour	Camryn
Olly Murs	1–2 April 2013	Right Place Right Time Tour	
Beyoncé	11–12 May 2013	The Mrs. Carter Show World Tour	
Meat Loaf	17 May 2013	Last at Bat Tour	
The Who	8 June 2013	The Who Tour 2012–2013	
Michael Bublé	15–20 July 2013	To Be Loved Tour	
Leonard Cohen	11–12 September 2013	Old Ideas World Tour	
Fleetwood Mac	20–21 September 2013	Fleetwood Mac Live	
Bruno Mars	3 October 2013	Moonshine Jungle Tour	
Jay-Z	6 October 2013	Magna Carter World Tour	
Depeche Mode	9 November 2013	The Delta Machine Tour	
Thirty Seconds to Mars	25 November 2013	Love, Lust, Faith and Dreams Tour	
Maroon 5	16 January 2014	Overexposed Tour	
Jason Derulo	30 March 2014	Tattoos World Tour	
Gary Barlow	31 March 2014	Since I Saw You Last Tour	Eliza Doolittle
Backstreet Boys	1 April 2014	In a World Like This Tour	
Miley Cyrus	20 May 2014	Bangerz Tour	Sky Ferreira
The Eagles	4–7 June 2014	History of the Eagles – Live in Concert	
Little Mix	8 June 2014	Salute Tour	
Dolly Parton	11 June 2014	Blue Smoke World Tour	
Bob Dylan	17 June 2014	Never Ending Tour 2014	
Ed Sheeran	3–6 October 2014	x Tour	
Lady Gaga	17 October 2014	ArtRave: The Artpop Ball	
Kylie Minogue	8 November 2014	Kiss Me Once Tour	
Slash feat. Myles Kennedy	9 November 2014	World on Fire World Tour	
Peter Gabriel	10 December 2014	Back to Front Tour	
Noel Gallagher's High Flying Birds	4 March 2015	Chasing Yesterday Tour	
Sting and Paul Simon	7 April 2015	On Stage Together Tour	
Olly Murs	10–12 April 2015	Never Been Better Tour	
Take That	8–9 May 2015	Take That Live	Ella Henderson
5 Seconds of Summer	28–29 May 2015	Rock Out with Your Socks Out Tour	
Roxette	1 June 2015	The Neverending World Tour	
Fleetwood Mac	20 June 2015	On with the Show	
The Who	23 June–11 July 2015	The Who Hits 50!	
Taylor Swift	29–30 June 2015	The 1989 World Tour	James Bay
Florence + The Machine	10 September 2015	How Big, How Blue, How Beautiful Tour	
One Direction	16–18 October 2015	On the Road Again Tour	
Imagine Dragons	18 November 2015	Smoke + Mirrors Tour	
U2	23–28 November 2015	Innocence + Experience Tour	
Def Leppard and Whitesnake	6 December 2015	Def Leppard World Tour 2015	
Jason Derulo	26 January 2016	Everything Is 4 Tour	
Adele	4–5 March 2016	Adele Live 2016	
Carrie Underwood	13 March 2016	Storyteller Tour: Stories in the Round	Little Big Town Sam Hunt Maddie & Tae
The 1975	24 March 2016	I Like It When You Sleep Tour	
Little Mix	30 March–18 April 2016	The Get Weird Tour	
Muse	5 April 2016	Drones World Tour	
5 Seconds of Summer	26–27 April 2016	Sounds Live Feels Live World Tour	
Justin Bieber	1–2 November 2016	Purpose World Tour	The Knocks; MiC Lowry
Rod Stewart	18–19 November 2016	From Gasoline Alley to Another Country: Hits 2016	
André Rieu	8 December 2016	2016 World Tour	
Black Sabbath	20 January 2017	The End Tour	
Olly Murs	3 April 2017	24 Hrs Tour	
Drake	19–20 February 2017	Boy Meets World Tour	
Ed Sheeran	12–13 April 2017	÷ Tour	Anne-Marie; Ryan McMullan
Bruno Mars	29–30 April 2017	24K Magic World Tour	Anderson Paak
Iron Maiden	6 May 2017	The Book of Souls World Tour	
Bob Dylan	11 May 2017	Never Ending Tour 2017	
Take That	15–16 May 2017	Wonderland Live	All Saints
Ariana Grande	20 May 2017	Dangerous Woman Tour	Victoria Monét; Bia
Shawn Mendes	27 May 2017	Illuminate World Tour	James TW
Aerosmith	14 June 2017	Aero-Vederci Baby! Tour	
Celtic Woman	2 September 2017 (Note: This was recorded as the Homecoming – Live from Ireland DVD and PBS special.)	Voices of Angels World Tour	
Red Hot Chili Peppers	20–21 September 2017	The Getaway World Tour	
Emeli Sandé	27 October 2017	Long Live the Angels Tour	
Little Mix	6 November 2017	The Glory Days Tour	
The Killers	16 November 2017	Wonderful Wonderful World Tour	
Queen + Adam Lambert	25 November 2017	Queen + Adam Lambert Tour 2017–2018	
Imagine Dragons	26 February 2018	Evolve World Tour	
Niall Horan	12–29 March 2018	Flicker World Tour	
Sam Smith	30–31 March 2018	The Thrill of It All Tour	
Harry Styles	16 April 2018	Harry Styles: Live on Tour	Mabel
Noel Gallagher's High Flying Birds	10 May 2018	Stranded on the Earth World Tour	
Bryan Adams	21–22 May 2018	Ultimate Tour	
Demi Lovato	25 May 2018	Tell Me You Love Me World Tour	Joy
Thirty Seconds to Mars	30 May 2018	Monolith Tour	
U2	5–10 June 2018	Experience + Innocence Tour	
Roger Waters	26–27 June 2018	Us + Them Tour	
Britney Spears	20 August 2018	Piece of Me Tour	Pitbull
Jason Derulo	19 September 2018	2Sides World Tour	
Arctic Monkeys	24–25 September 2018	Tranquility Base Hotel & Casino Tour	The Lemon Twigs
Shania Twain	26–27 September 2018	Now Tour	
Slayer	1 November 2018	Slayer Farewell Tour	
Mumford & Sons	16 November 2018	Delta Tour	
Florence + The Machine	19 November 2018	High as Hope Tour	
Kylie Minogue	3 December 2018	Golden Tour	
The 1975	10 January 2019	Music for Cars Tour	
Post Malone	14 February 2019	Beerbongs & Bentleys Tour	
Twenty One Pilots	1 March 2019	The Bandito Tour	
Drake	19–22 March 2019	Assassination Vacation Tour	
Shawn Mendes	13–14 April 2019	Shawn Mendes: The Tour	Alessia Cara
Take That	29–30 April 2019	Greatest Hits Live	Rick Astley
Mariah Carey	22 May 2019	Caution World Tour	
Hugh Jackman	30–31 May 2019 (Note: Two shows on 31 May 2019.)	The Man. The Music. The Show.	
Anne-Marie	1 June 2019 (Note: This was Anne-Marie's biggest headline show to date)	Speak Your Mind Tour	
Michael Bublé	6–7 June 2019	An Evening with Michael Bublé	
Backstreet Boys	11 June 2019	DNA World Tour	
Elton John	12–13 June 2019	Farewell Yellow Brick Road	
Stevie Wonder	9 July 2019	The Stevie Wonder Song Party	
Ariana Grande	22–25 September 2019	Sweetener World Tour	Ella Mai; Social House
Khalid	24 September 2019	Free Spirit World Tour	
Little Mix	8–11 October 2019	LM5: The Tour	
A-ha	29 October 2019	Hunting High and Low Tour	
Cher	1 November 2019	Here We Go Again Tour	
Christina Aguilera	5 November 2019	The X Tour	
Ghost	20 November 2019	A Pale Tour Named Death	
Liam Gallagher	23–24 November 2019	Why Me? Why Not Tour	
Björk	28 November 2019	Cornucopia Tour	
The Lumineers	29 November 2019	III: The World Tour	
Dido	1 December 2019	Still On My Mind Tour	
Rod Stewart	4 December 2019	Red Blood Roses - Live In Concert	
Slipknot	14 January 2020	We Are Not Your Kind Tour	
Jonas Brothers	31 January 2020	Happiness Begins Tour	
Tenacious D	10 February 2020	Post-Apocalypto Tour	
The 1975	3 March 2020	Music for Cars Tour	
The Script	6–7 March 2020	Sunset & Full Moons 2020 UK Tour	
Halsey	10 March 2020	Manic World Tour	
Simple Minds	17 April 2022	40 Years Of Hits Tour	
Dua Lipa	20–21 April 2022	Future Nostalgia Tour	Griff
Anne-Marie	3 May 2022	Dysfunctional Tour	Billen Ted and GRACEY
Tool	6 May 2022	Fear Inoculum Tour	Brass Against
Whitesnake and Foreigner	10 May 2022	The Farewell Tour MMXXII	Europe
David Gray	19–21 May 2022	White Ladder: 20th Anniversary Tour	
Bryan Adams	30 May 2022	So Happy It Hurts Tour	
Billie Eilish	4–5 June 2022	Happier Than Ever: The World Tour	Jessie Reyez and Jungle
YUNGBLUD	10 June 2022	Life On Mars Tour	Nova Twins
50 Cent	12 June 2022	Green Light Gang World Tour	
The Script	15 June 2022	Tales From The Script - Greatest Hits Tour	
Kaleo	19 June 2022	Fight Or Flight Tour	
Elbow	20 June 2022	Flying Dream 1 Tour	
Alanis Morissette	21 June 2022	Jagged Little Pill: 25th Anniversary Tour	Beth Orton
Kings of Leon	24 June 2022	When You See Yourself Tour	Fangclub
Nile Rodgers & CHIC	1 July 2022	Nile Rodgers & CHIC Tour 2022	
Diana Ross	3 July 2022	Thank You Tour	
Brad Paisley	16 July 2022	Brad Paisley Tour 2022	
Madness	6 August 2022	The Ladykillers Tour	Squeeze
Gorillaz	17 August 2022	World Tour 2022	Moonchild Sanelly
Machine Gun Kelly	9 October 2022	Mainstream Sellout Tour	Iann Dior and 44phantom
The Cure	1 December 2022	Shows Of A Lost World Tour	The Twilight Sad
Westlife	20–22 December 2022	The Wild Dreams Tour	
The 1975	29 January 2023	At Their Very Best	
Paramore	13 April 2023	This Is Why Tour	Bloc Party and Rozi Plain
Post Malone	9–10 May 2023	Twelve Carat Tour	Rae Sremmurd
Arctic Monkeys	15–19 October 2023	The Car Tour	Miles Kane
Melanie Martinez	17 November 2023	Portals Tour	UPSAHL
50 Cent	6–7 November 2023	The Final Lap Tour	Busta Rhymes
Jason Derulo	14 March 2024	Nu King World Tour	
blk.	17 March 2024	MCD, District 8 & Reboot Events Presents	
Madison Beer	31 March 2024	The Spinnin Tour	Jann and Jillian Rossi
The Kid Laroi	14 April 2024	The First Time Tour	Sam Tompkins
Take That	22 April–23 April 2024	This Life on Tour	Olly Murs
Olivia Rodrigo	30 April–1 May	Guts World Tour	Remi Wolf
Tenacious D	5 May 2024	The Spicy Meatball Tour	Dave Hill
Girls Aloud	17–18 May 2024	The Girls Aloud Show	
Jonas Brothers	19 June 2024	Five Albums. One Night. The World Tour	Mimi Webb
Sabrina Carpenter	3–4 March 2025	Short n' Sweet Tour	Rachel Chinouriri
James Blunt	6 March 2025	Back to Bedlam 20th Anniversary Tour	
Gracie Abrams	10 March 2025	The Secret of Us Tour	Dora Jar
Teddy Swims	12–13 March 2025	I've Tried Everything but Therapy Tour	Cian Ducrot
Alex Warren	19 March 2025	Cheaper than Therapy Tour	
Sugababes	20 April 2025	Sugababes '25 Tour	
Central Cee	22 April 2025	Can't Rush Greatness World Tour	
Olly Murs	29 April 2025	15 Years of Hits - Live 2025	
Twenty One Pilots	9 May 2025	The Clancy World Tour	Balu Brigada
Tate McRae	16–17 May 2025	Miss Possessive Tour	Benee
Bryan Adams	20–23 May 2025		
Tyler, the Creator	24–25 May 2025	Chromakopia: The World Tour	Lil Yachty and Paris Texas
Don Toliver	30 May 2025	Psycho Tour	
Lionel Richie	1 June 2025	Say Hello To The Hits Tour	
Pitbull	5–6 June 2025	Party After Dark Tour	
Camila Cabello	9 July 2025	Yours, C Tour	
Billie Eilish	26–27 July 2025	Hit Me Hard and Soft: The Tour	
Addison Rae	25 August 2025	The Addison Tour	
Tom Grennan	13 September 2025	GRENNAN '25 Tour	Tom Walker and Allie Sherlock
OneRepublic	18 September 2025	Escape to Europe Tour	
Lewis Capaldi	29–30 September 2025	UK & Ireland Tour	Skye Newman and Aaron Rowe
Benson Boone	24 October 2025	American Heart World Tour	Elliot James Reay
Zara Larsson	7 November 2025	Midnight Sun Tour	
JLS	11 November 2025	The Club Is Alive: 2025 Hits Tour	
My Bloody Valentine	22 November 2025		
Bob Dylan	25 November 2025		
Ed Sheeran	9 December 2025	Loop Tour	
Kneecap	16–17 December 2025		
Kingfishr	18–19 December 2025		
Cian Ducrot	20 December 2025	The Dream Ship Tour 2025	
Picture This	29–30 December 2025	Home For Christmas	
James Arthur	1 February 2026	Pisces World Tour	
Jason Derulo	9 February 2026	The Last Dance World Tour	
Raye	4–5 March 2026	This Tour May Contain New Music	
K-Pop Forever!	9–11 March 2026	K-pop tribute act tour	The KK Sisters
Machine Gun Kelly	12 March 2026	Lost Americana Tour	Julia Wolf
Sombr	16 March 2026	The Late Nights & Young Romance Tour	
Kesha	21 March 2026	The Tits Out Tour	
5 Seconds of Summer	27 March 2026	Everyone's a Star! World Tour	South Arcade and Master Peace
Gorillaz	1–2 April 2026	The Mountain Tour	Trueno
Rick Astley	14 April 2026	The Reflection Tour 2026	
Louis Tomlinson	30 April 2026	How Did We Get Here? World Tour	
Alex Warren	6–7 May 2026	Little Orphan Alex Live	
Tame Impala	13 May 2026	Deadbeat Tour	RIP Magic
The Neighbourhood	17 May 2026	Wourld Tour	Neggy Gemmy and Noise Dept.
Doja Cat	19 May 2026	Tour Ma Vie World Tour	
Jazzy	24 October 2026	Peace & Patience Tour	
Niall Horan	9–13 November 2026	Dinner Party: Live on Tour	
Don Toliver	16 November 2026	Octane World Tour	
Myles Smith	17 November 2026	My Mess, My Heart, My Life. Tour	
Noah Kahan	19–22 November 2026	The Great Divide Tour	
Kneecap	16 December 2026		
Charli XCX	13 February 2027	Music, Fashion, Film Tour	
Teddy Swims	8 April 2027	The Ugly Tour	
Gracie Abrams	19–20 April 2027	The Look at My Life Tour	

== Comedy performances ==
Event/Artist/Band	Dates	Tour / Notes
Peter Kay	28–30 April and 1–3 May 2011	The Tour That Doesn't Tour Tour...Now On Tour
John Bishop	7–11 November 2012	Rollercoaster Tour
Michael McIntyre	16–19 November 2012	Showtime Tour
Bill Bailey	29 April 2022	En Route To Normal
Ricky Gervais	26–27 March 2025	
Mario Rosenstock	28 March 2025	Gift Grub Live '25
Kevin Hart	6 May 2025	Acting My Age
Gabriel Iglesias	27 June 2025	
Peter Kay	10–12 July 2025 and 17–18 April 2026	Better Late Than Never Again
John Bishop	29–31 October 2025	25
Jimmy Carr	3 December 2025	Laughs Funny
Bill Bailey	13 December 2026	Vaudevillean
John Bishop	16 May 2027	Let's Go Round Again

- Peter Kay performed a record six consecutive nights at the venue in April/May 2011, all of which sold out.
