= There Is a Hell... Tour =

2010–11 concert tour by Bring Me the Horizon

- Tour by Bring Me the Horizon
- European Summer Tour 2011
- Location: North America, Europe, Oceania, Asia, South America
- Associated album: There Is a Hell Believe Me I've Seen It. There Is a Heaven Let's Keep It a Secret.
- Start date: 21 June 2010
- End date: 6 December 2011
- Legs: 15
- No. of shows: 290: 149 North America (1 cancelled); 117 Europe (2 cancelled); 13 Oceania; 6 South America; 5 Asia

Bring Me the Horizon concert chronology
- Suicide Season Tour (2008–09); There Is a Hell... Tour (2010–12); Sempiternal Tour (2012–14)

There Is a Hell... Tour was a concert tour by British rock band Bring Me the Horizon, taking place during 2010–2011, in support of their third studio album There Is a Hell Believe Me I've Seen It. There Is a Heaven Let's Keep It a Secret.

The tour began with the band playing as part of the Vans Warped Tour throughout June–August 2010, just a few days after finishing recording the album. In the middle of the tour, the band skipped out a few Warped Tour dates in order to participate in the Sonisphere Festival in Knebworth, England on 1 August 2010.

Following Warped Tour, the band supported Bullet for My Valentine on their tour of Asia and Oceania in early September, and late September saw the band headlining their own tour of the UK with supporting acts Cancer Bats and Tek-One. Throughout October–November 2010, the band co-headlining the Alternative Press Tour with August Burns Red and supporting acts Emarosa, Polar Bear Club and This Is Hell in the US, and in December the band supported once again Bullet for My Valentine in a series of special 5 UK arena shows.

January 2011 saw the band headlining the first European leg of the tour with supporting acts The Devil Wears Prada and Architects, which was followed by dates in Indonesia, Japan and Australia, playing as part of the Soundwave Festival dates.

In March–April 2011, the band supported A Day to Remember on a US tour with other supporting acts Pierce the Veil and We Came as Romans, which was followed by another UK tour and a summer European tour of mostly festival appearances in such festivals as Rock am Ring, Nova Rock, Metaltown, Pukkelpop, Graspop and more.

The band headlined a US tour in September 2011, with support from Parkway Drive, Architects, Deez Nuts and While She Sleeps, and a South American tour in October 2011, and supporting Machine Head as a special guest on their European winter tour in November–December 2011, along with DevilDriver and Darkest Hour, which was the band's final leg before concluding the tour and going back home to work on their follow-up album.

== Set list ==
North America, Leg #1 (Warped Tour 2010)
- "Diamonds Aren't Forever"
- "The Comedown"
- "Sleep With One Eye Open"
- "The Sadness Will Never End"
- "Suicide Season"
- "Pray for Plagues"
- "Chelsea Smile"
- "Football Season Is Over"
Oceania, Leg #1
- "It Never Ends"
- "The Comedown"
- "Diamonds Aren't Forever"
- "Pray for Plagues"
- "The Sadness Will Never End"
- "Suicide Season"
- "Football Season Is Over"
- "Sleep With One Eye Open"
- "Chelsea Smile"
United Kingdom, Leg #1
- "It Never Ends"
- "The Comedown"
- "Diamonds Aren't Forever"
- "Pray for Plagues"
- "Fuck"
- "The Sadness Will Never End"
- "Suicide Season"
- "Sleep With One Eye Open"
- "Football Season Is Over"

Encore

- "Chelsea Smile"
North America, Leg #2
- "It Never Ends"
- "The Comedown"
- "Diamonds Aren't Forever"
- "Pray for Plagues"
- "The Sadness Will Never End" (Played on a few selected dates)
- "Fuck"
- "Crucify Me"
- "Football Season Is Over"
- "Chelsea Smile"
United Kingdom, Leg #2
- "It Never Ends"
- "Chelsea Smile"
- "Fuck"
- "The Sadness Will Never End"
- "Crucify Me"
- "Blessed with a Curse"
- "Diamonds Aren't Forever"
Europe, Leg #1
- "It Never Ends"
- "Chelsea Smile"
- "Alligator Blood"
- "Pray for Plagues" (Not played on all dates)
- "Fuck"
- "The Sadness Will Never End"
- "Crucify Me"
- "Football Season Is Over"
- "Blessed with a Curse"
- "Anthem"

Encore

- "Diamonds Aren't Forever"
Asia, Leg #2
- "It Never Ends"
- "Diamonds Aren't Forever"
- "Alligator Blood"
- "Fuck"
- "The Sadness Will Never End"
- "Crucify Me"
- "Pray for Plagues"
- "Football Season Is Over"
- "Blessed with a Curse"
- "Anthem"

Encore

- "Suicide Season"
- "Chelsea Smile"
Oceania, Leg #2
- "It Never Ends"
- "Diamonds Aren't Forever"
- "Fuck"
- "Pray for Plagues"
- "Alligator Blood"
- "Blessed with a Curse"
- "The Sadness Will Never End"
- "Crucify Me"
- "Anthem"
- "Football Season Is Over"

Encore

- "Suicide Season"
- "Chelsea Smile"
North America, Leg #2
- "It Never Ends"
- "Diamonds Aren't Forever"
- "Alligator Blood"
- "Fuck"
- "Crucify Me" / "Blessed with a Curse" (Varied between shows)
- "Anthem"
- "Chelsea Smile"
United Kingdom, Leg #3
- "It Never Ends"
- "Fuck"
- "The Comedown"
- "Alligator Blood"
- "The Sadness Will Never End"
- "Blessed with a Curse"
- "Home Sweet Hole"
- "Diamonds Aren't Forever"
- "For Steve Wonder's Eyes Only (Braille)" / "Pray for Plagues" (Varied between shows)
- "Suicide Season"
- "Anthem"

Encore

- "Crucify Me"
- "Chelsea Smile"
- "No Need for Introductions, I've Read About Girls Like You on the Backs of Toilet Doors."
Europe, Leg #2
- "Diamonds Aren't Forever"
- "Alligator Blood"
- "Fuck"
- "Crucify Me"
- "Pray for Plagues"
- "Football Season Is Over"
- "Blessed with a Curse"
- "The Sadness Will Never End"
- "Anthem"

Encore

- "It Never Ends"
- "Suicide Season" (Not played on every date)
- "Chelsea Smile"
- "No Need for Introductions, I've Read About Girls Like You on the Backs of Toilet Doors."

== Tour dates ==
Date	City	Country	Venue
North America, Leg #1 As part of the Warped Tour 2010
21 June 2010	Fresno	United States	The Starline
22 June 2010	Bakersfield	United States	Jerry's Pizza
23 June 2010	Las Vegas	United States	Alt Press 25th Anniversary Bash
25 June 2010	Carson	United States	The Home Depot Center
26 June 2010	Mountain View	United States	Shoreline Amphitheatre
27 June 2010	Ventura	United States	Seaside Park
29 June 2010	Phoenix	United States	Cricket Wireless Pavilion
30 June 2010	Las Cruces	United States	NMSU Practice Field
1 July 2010	San Antonio	United States	AT&T Center
2 July 2010	Houston	United States	The Showgrounds at Sam Houston Race Park
3 July 2010	Dallas	United States	SuperPages.com Center
5 July 2010	Maryland Heights	United States	Verizon Wireless Amphitheater
6 July 2010	Nobesville	United States	Verizon Wireless Music Center
7 July 2010	Burgettstown	United States	First Niagara Pavilion
8 July 2010	Cleveland	United States	Time Warner Cable Amphitheater
9 July 2010	Mississauga	Canada	Arrow Hall
10 July 2010	Montreal	Canada	Parc Jean-Drapeau
11 July 2010	Hartford	United States	Meadows Music Theater
13 July 2010	Mansfield	United States	Comcast Center for the Performing Arts
14 July 2010	Corfu	United States	Darien Lake Performing Arts Center
15 July 2010	Scranton	United States	Toyota Pavilion at Montage Mountain
16 July 2010	Camden	United States	Susquehanna Bank Center
17 July 2010	Uniondale	United States	Nassau Veterans Memorial Coliseum
18 July 2010	Oceanport	United States	Monmouth Park Racetrack
20 July 2010	Columbia	United States	Merriweather Post Pavilion
21 July 2010	Virginia Beach	United States	Virginia Beach Amphitheater
22 July 2010	Charlotte	United States	Verizon Wireless Amphitheatre
23 July 2010	St. Petersburg	United States	Vinoy Park
24 July 2010	West Palm Beach	United States	Cruzan Amphitheatre
25 July 2010	Orlando	United States	Central Florida Fairgrounds
26 July 2010	Atlanta	United States	Lakewood Amphitheatre
28 July 2010	Cincinnati	United States	Riverbend Music Center
29 July 2010	Milwaukee	United States	Marcus Amphitheater
30 July 2010	Detroit	United States	Comerica Park
United Kingdom (Special festival date)
1 August 2010	Knebworth	England	Sonisphere Festival
North America, Leg #1 (Continued)
5 August 2010	Edmonton	Canada	Northlands Park
7 August 2010	Salt Lake City	United States	Utah State Fairgrounds
8 August 2010	Denver	United States	Invesco Field
10 August 2010	Chula Vista	United States	Cricket Wireless Amphitheatre
11 August 2010	Pomona	United States	Pomona Fairplex
12 August 2010	Wheatland	United States	Sleep Train Amphitheatre
13 August 2010	Nampa	United States	Idaho Center Amphitheater
14 August 2010	George	United States	The Gorge Amphitheatre
15 August 2010	Portland	United States	Washington County Fairgrounds
Asia, Leg #1 Supporting Bullet for My Valentine, w/ Cancer Bats
1 September 2010	Tokyo	Japan	AgeHa
2 September 2010	Osaka	Japan	Namba Hatch
Oceania, Leg #1 Supporting Bullet for My Valentine, w/ Cancer Bats
5 September 2010	Perth	Australia	Challenge Stadium
7 September 2010	Torrensville	Australia	Thebarton Theatre
8 September 2010	Geelong	Australia	National Hotel
9 September 2010	Melbourne	Australia	Festival Hall
10 September 2010	Sydney	Australia	Hordern Pavilion
11 September 2010	Brisbane	Australia	Riverstage
United Kingdom, Leg #1 Support acts: Cancer Bats and Tek-One
21 September 2010	Oxford	England	O_{2} Academy Oxford
22 September 2010	Norwich	England	The Waterfront
23 September 2010	Birmingham	England	O_{2} Academy Birmingham
24 September 2010	Glasgow	Scotland	The Garage
25 September 2010	Leeds	England	The Cockpit
27 September 2010	Manchester	England	Club Academy
28 September 2010	Colchester	England	Colchester Arts Centre
29 September 2010	Brighton	England	Concorde 2
30 September 2010	Exeter	England	Lemon Grove
1 October 2010	London	England	Relentless Garage
4 October 2010	London	England	Borderline
North America, Leg #2 Supporting August Burns Red, w/ Emarosa, Polar Bear Club and This Is Hell
13 October 2010	Detroit	United States	The Crofoot
14 October 2010	Cincinnati	United States	Bogart's
15 October 2010	Sauget	United States	Pop's
16 October 2010	Milwaukee	United States	The Rave / Eagles Club
17 October 2010	Chicago	United States	House of Blues
19 October 2010	Minneapolis	United States	The Cabooze
20 October 2010	Kansas City	United States	Beaumont Club
21 October 2010	Denver	United States	Summit Music Hall
22 October 2010	Salt Lake City	United States	In the Venue
24 October 2010	Seattle	United States	Showbox at the Market
25 October 2010	Portland	United States	Wonder Ballroom
27 October 2010	San Francisco	United States	Regency Ballroom
28 October 2010	Pomona	United States	Pomona Fox Theater
29 October 2010	Los Angeles	United States	Club Nokia
30 October 2010	San Diego	United States	Soma San Diego
31 October 2010	Las Vegas	United States	House of Blues
2 November 2010	Tucson	United States	Rialto Theatre
3 November 2010	El Paso	United States	Club 101
4 November 2010	Austin	United States	Emo's
5 November 2010	San Antonio	United States	The White Rabbit
6 November 2010	Dallas	United States	House of Blues
7 November 2010	Houston	United States	Warehouse Live
9 November 2010	Hollywood	United States	Hard Rock Live
10 November 2010	Fort Lauderdale	United States	Revolution
11 November 2010	Tampa	United States	The Ritz Ybor
12 November 2010	Atlanta	United States	The Masquerade
13 November 2010	Nashville	United States	Rocketown
14 November 2010	Charlotte	United States	Amos' Southend Music Hall
16 November 2010	Norfolk	United States	The NorVa
17 November 2010	Baltimore	United States	Sonar
18 November 2010	Philadelphia	United States	Electric Factory
19 November 2010	Boston	United States	House of Blues
20 November 2010	Buffalo	United States	Club Infinity
21 November 2010	Toronto	Canada	Kool Haus
22 November 2010	Montreal	Canada	Métropolis
24 November 2010	New York City	United States	Best Buy Theater
25 November 2010	New Haven	United States	Toad's Place
26 November 2010	Sayreville	United States	Starland Ballroom
27 November 2010	Allentown	United States	Crocodile Rock Café
28 November 2010	Cleveland	United States	House of Blues
30 November 2010	Mexico City	Mexico	José Cuervo Salón
United Kingdom, Leg #2 Supporting Bullet for My Valentine, with Atreyu
6 December 2010	Birmingham	England	National Indoor Arena
8 December 2010	Manchester	England	Manchester Evening News Arena
9 December 2010	Glasgow	Scotland	S.E.C.C.
11 December 2010	Cardiff	Wales	Motorpoint Arena
12 December 2010	London	England	Wembley Arena
Europe, Leg #1 Support acts: The Devil Wears Prada, Architects and Tek-One
14 January 2011	Zürich	Switzerland	Volkshaus
15 January 2011	Milan	Italy	Magazzini Generali
16 January 2011	Vienna	Austria	Arena
18 January 2011	Stuttgart	Germany	LKA-Longhorn
19 January 2011	Luxembourg City	Luxembourg	Den Atelier
20 January 2011	Brussels	Belgium	Ancienne Belgique
21 January 2011	Amsterdam	Netherlands	Melkweg
22 January 2011	Paris	France	Bataclan
23 January 2011	Cologne	Germany	Essigfabrik
25 January 2011	Hamburg	Germany	Grünspan Club
26 January 2011	Malmö	Sweden	KB
27 January 2011	Stockholm	Sweden	Fryshuset
29 January 2011	Helsinki	Finland	Kulttuuritalo
31 January 2011	Gothenburg	Sweden	Trädgårn
1 February 2011	Copenhagen	Denmark	Vega
2 February 2011	Berlin	Germany	Columbia Club
3 February 2011	Herford	Germany	X
4 February 2011	Frankfurt	Germany	Batschkapp
5 February 2011	Chemnitz	Germany	Südbahnhof
6 February 2011	Munich	Germany	Backstage Werk
Asia, Leg #2 Support act: Deez Nuts
19 February 2011	Jakarta	Indonesia	Tennis Indoor Senayan
22 February 2011	Tokyo	Japan	Shibuya Club Quattro
23 February 2011	Osaka	Japan	Shinsaibashi Club Quattro
Oceania, Leg #2 Support acts: Asking Alexandria and The Amity Affliction
26 February 2011	Brisbane	Australia	Soundwave Festival
27 February 2011	Sydney	Australia	Soundwave Festival
1 March 2011	Sydney	Australia	University of NSW Roundhouse
2 March 2011	Melbourne	Australia	HiFi Bar and Ballroom
4 March 2011	Melbourne	Australia	Soundwave Festival
5 March 2011	Adelaide	Australia	Soundwave Festival
7 March 2011	Perth	Australia	Soundwave Festival
North America, Leg #2 Supporting A Day to Remember, with We Came as Romans and Pierce the Veil
10 March 2011	Philadelphia	United States	Electric Factory
11 March 2011	Philadelphia	United States	Electric Factory
12 March 2011	Worcester	United States	The Palladium
13 March 2011	Worcester	United States	The Palladium
14 March 2011	Farmingdale	United States	The Crazy Donkey
16 March 2011	Pittsburgh	United States	Stage AE
17 March 2011	Clifton Park	United States	~~Northern Lights~~ Cancelled
17 March 2011	Pittsburgh	United States	Stage AE
18 March 2011	Niagara Falls	United States	The Rapids Theatre
19 March 2011	Montreal	Canada	Métropolis
20 March 2011	Toronto	Canada	Sound Academy
22 March 2011	Royal Oak	United States	Royal Oak Music Theatre
23 March 2011	Royal Oak	United States	Royal Oak Music Theatre
24 March 2011	Chicago	United States	Congress Theater
25 March 2011	Minneapolis	United States	Club Epic
26 March 2011	Kansas City	United States	Beaumont Club
27 March 2011	Denver	United States	The Fillmore
29 March 2011	Salt Lake City	United States	The Great Salt Air
30 March 2011	Spokane	United States	Knitting Factory
31 March 2011	Seattle	United States	Showbox at the Market
1 April 2011	Vancouver	Canada	Vogue Theatre
2 April 2011	Portland	United States	Roseland Theatre
3 April 2011	San Francisco	United States	The Warfield
5 April 2011	Fresno	United States	Woodward Park Amphitheater
6 April 2011	Los Angeles	United States	Hollywood Palladium
7 April 2011	San Diego	United States	San Diego Sports Arena
8 April 2011	Phoenix	United States	Marquee Theatre
9 April 2011	Phoenix	United States	Marquee Theatre
11 April 2011	Tulsa	United States	Brady Theater
12 April 2011	Austin	United States	ACL Live
13 April 2011	Houston	United States	Warehouse Live
15 April 2011	Atlanta	United States	Masquerade Outdoor
16 April 2011	Orlando	United States	Earthday Birthday
17 April 2011	Boca Raton	United States	Sunset Cove Amphitheater
18 April 2011	St. Petersburg	United States	Jannus Landing
United Kingdom, Leg #3 Support acts: Parkway Drive, The Devil Wears Prada and Architects
22 April 2011	Manchester	England	O_{2} Apollo Manchester
23 April 2011	Newcastle upon Tyne	England	O_{2} Academy Newcastle
24 April 2011	Glasgow	Scotland	O_{2} Academy Glasgow
26 April 2011	Nottingham	England	Rock City
27 April 2011	Southampton	England	Southampton Guildhall
28 April 2011	Birmingham	England	O_{2} Academy Birmingham
29 April 2011	Bristol	England	~~O_{2} Academy Bristol~~ Cancelled
30 April 2011	London	England	Academy Brixton
1 May 2011	Cardiff	Wales	Cardiff University
2 May 2011	Leicester	England	O_{2} Academy Leicester
3 May 2011	Bristol	England	O_{2} Academy Bristol
4 May 2011	Sheffield	England	O_{2} Academy Sheffield
Europe, Leg #2
3 June 2011	Nuremberg	Germany	Rock im Park
4 June 2011	Nürburg	Germany	Rock am Ring
5 June 2011	Amsterdam	Netherlands	Powerfest
6 June 2011	Lille	France	Le Splendid
10 June 2011	Donington	England	Download Festival
11 June 2011	Bruges	Belgium	Het Entrepot
13 June 2011	Nickelsdorf	Austria	Nova Rock Festival
14 June 2011	Zagreb	Croatia	~~Mochvara~~ Cancelled
15 June 2011	Budapest	Hungary	Dürer-kert
16 June 2011	Prague	Czech Republic	Meet Factory
18 June 2011	Gothenburg	Sweden	Metaltown Festival
20 June 2011	Karlsruhe	Germany	Substage
21 June 2011	Aschaffenburg	Germany	Colos-Saal
22 June 2011	Solothurn	Switzerland	Kulturfabrik Kofmehl
23 June 2011	Marseille	France	Cabaret Aléatoire
24 June 2011	Basel	Switzerland	Sonisphere Festival
25 June 2011	Imola	Italy	Sonisphere Festival
26 June 2011	Dessel	Belgium	Graspop Metal Meeting
28 June 2011	Münster	Germany	Sputnikhalle
29 June 2011	Hamburg	Germany	Grünspan Club
1 July 2011	Löbnitz	Germany	With Full Force Festival
3 July 2011	Roskilde	Denmark	Roskilde Festival
6 July 2011	Tel Aviv	Israel	Barby Club
8 July 2011	Amnéville	France	Sonisphere Festival
9 July 2011	Turku	Finland	Ruisrock Festival
30 July 2011	Lugo	Spain	Resurrection Fest
12 August 2011	Oslo	Norway	Øyafestivalen
18 August 2011	Hasselt	Belgium	Pukkelpop
24 August 2011	Belfast	Northern Ireland	Mandela Hall
25 August 2011	Dublin	Ireland	The Academy
26 August 2011	Reading	England	Reading Festival
27 August 2011	Leeds	England	Leeds Festival
North America, Leg #3 Support acts: Parkway Drive, Architects, Deez Nuts with Of Legends and On Broken Wings on select dates
31 August 2011	San Diego	United States	House of Blues
1 September 2011	San Diego	United States	House of Blues
2 September 2011	Los Angeles	United States	Hollywood Palladium
3 September 2011	San Francisco	United States	The Fillmore
5 September 2011	Portland	United States	Roseland Theater
6 September 2011	Seattle	United States	Showbox at the Market
7 September 2011	Vancouver	Canada	Commodore Ballroom
9 September 2011	Edmonton	Canada	Edmonton Event Centre
10 September 2011	Calgary	Canada	MacEwan Hall
11 September 2011	Saskatoon	Canada	Odeon Events Centre
12 September 2011	Winnipeg	Canada	Garrick Centre
13 September 2011	Minneapolis	United States	First Avenue
14 September 2011	Chicago	United States	House of Blues
15 September 2011	Detroit	United States	The Fillmore Detroit
16 September 2011	Toronto	Canada	Phoenix Concert Theatre
17 September 2011	Montreal	Canada	Métropolis
19 September 2011	Boston	United States	House of Blues
20 September 2011	Clifton Park	United States	Northern Lights
21 September 2011	New York City	United States	Roseland Ballroom
22 September 2011	Philadelphia	United States	Electric Factory
24 September 2011	Charlotte	United States	The Fillmore Charlotte
25 September 2011	Atlanta	United States	The Tabernacle
26 September 2011	Memphis	United States	New Daisy Theater
27 September 2011	Dallas	United States	House of Blues
28 September 2011	Houston	United States	House of Blues
29 September 2011	San Antonio	United States	Backstage Live
30 September 2011	Lubbock	United States	The Pavilion
1 October 2011	Albuquerque	United States	Sunshine Theater
2 October 2011	Denver	United States	Fillmore Auditorium
3 October 2011	Salt Lake City	United States	In the Venue
4 October 2011	Las Vegas	United States	House of Blues
6 October 2011	Mexico City	Mexico	El Plaza Condesa
South America
8 October 2011	Bogotá	Colombia	Teatro Metropol
9 October 2011	Caracas	Venezuela	"CECIM" City Market
11 October 2011	Santiago	Chile	Teatro Teletón
13 October 2011	Buenos Aires	Argentina	Teatro Flores
15 October 2011	São Paulo	Brazil	Carioca Club
16 October 2011	Curitiba	Brazil	Curitiba Master Hall
Europe, Leg #3 Supporting Machine Head, with DevilDriver and Darkest Hour
1 November 2011	Oslo	Norway	Sentrum Scene
3 November 2011	Stockholm	Sweden	Fryshuset
5 November 2011	Tampere	Finland	Tampere Hall
6 November 2011	Helsinki	Finland	The Circus
8 November 2011	Copenhagen	Denmark	K.B. Hallen
9 November 2011	Hamburg	Germany	Große Freiheit
10 November 2011	Dresden	Germany	Alter Schlachthof
12 November 2011	Vienna	Austria	Gasometer
13 November 2011	Milan	Italy	Alcatraz
15 November 2011	Barcelona	Spain	Razzmatazz
16 November 2011	Madrid	Spain	La Riviera
17 November 2011	Lisbon	Portugal	Coliseu dos Recreios
18 November 2011	Porto	Portugal	Coliseu do Porto
19 November 2011	Bilbao	Spain	Rock Star Live
21 November 2011	Zurich	Switzerland	Volkshaus
23 November 2011	Paris	France	Le Zénith
24 November 2011	Neu-Isenburg	Germany	Hugenottenhalle
25 November 2011	Munich	Germany	Kesselhaus
26 November 2011	Ludwigsburg	Germany	Arena
28 November 2011	Eindhoven	Netherlands	Klokgebouw
29 November 2011	Brussels	Belgium	Forest National
30 November 2011	Oberhausen	Germany	Turbinenhalle
1 December 2011	Esch-sur-Alzette	Luxembourg	Rockhal
3 December 2011	London	England	Wembley Arena
4 December 2011	Birmingham	England	National Indoor Arena
5 December 2011	Glasgow	Scotland	S.E.C.C.
6 December 2011	Manchester	England	Manchester Central Convention Complex

== Support acts ==
- A Night in Hollywood (21 June 2010)
- Architects (14 January–6 February 2011; 22 April–4 May 2011; 6, 11, 14, 15, 20–23, 28–29 June 2011; 31 August–6 October 2011)
- Asking Alexandria (1–2 March 2011)
- Atreyu (6–12 December 2010)
- Cancer Bats (1–7, 9–11, 21–30 September 2010)
- Carnifex (6 October 2011)
- Deez Nuts (19–23 February 2011; 14, 15, 20–22, 29 June 2011; 31 August–4 October 2011)
- Emarosa (13 October–28 November 2010)
- Enter Shikari (23 June 2010)
- Here Comes the Kraken (30 November 2010)
- Momma Knows Best (16 June 2011)
- Morda (11 June 2011)
- Of Legends (31 August–17 September 2011)
- On Broken Wings (19 September–4 October 2011)
- Parkway Drive (22 April–3 May 2011; 6 September–4 October 2011)
- Pierce the Veil (10 March–18 April 2011)
- Polar Bear Club (13 October–28 November 2010)
- Silverstein (6 June 2011)
- Snite.No (30 November 2010)
- Suicide Silence (31 August–5 September 2011)
- Tek-One (21 September–1 October 2010; 14 January–16 February 2011)
- The Amity Affliction (1–2 March 2011)
- The Blackstone Chronicles (16 June 2011)
- The Devil Wears Prada (14 January–6 February 2011; 22 April–4 May 2011)
- This Is Hell (13 October–28 November 2010)
- TRC (27 September 2010)
- We Came as Romans (10 March–18 April 2011)
- While She Sleeps (4 May 2011; 28–29 June 2011; 24–25 August 2011)
- You Me at Six (21–23 June 2010)
- Your Demise (21–23 June 2010)

== As a supporting act ==
- A Day to Remember (10 March–18 April 2011)
- August Burns Red (13 October–2, 4–28 November 2010) (Co-Headliner)
- Bullet for My Valentine (1–7, 9–11 September 2010; 6–12 December 2010)
- Machine Head (1 November–6 December 2011)

== Songs played ==
From Count Your Blessings

- "Pray for Plagues"
- "For Stevie Wonder's Eyes Only (Braille)"
- "Off the Heezay"

From Suicide Season

- "The Comedown"
- "Chelsea Smile"
- "Football Season Is Over"
- "Sleep with One Eye Open"
- "Diamonds Aren't Forever"
- "The Sadness Will Never End"
- "No Need for Introductions, I've Read About Girls Like You on the Backs of Toilet Doors"
- "Suicide Season"

From There Is a Hell Believe Me I've Seen It. There Is a Heaven Let's Keep It a Secret.

- "Crucify Me"
- "Anthem"
- "It Never Ends"
- "Fuck"
- "Home Sweet Hole"
- "Alligator Blood"
- "Memorial"
- "Blessed with a Curse"
- "Visions"
