= Rockhal =

Music venue in Luxembourg

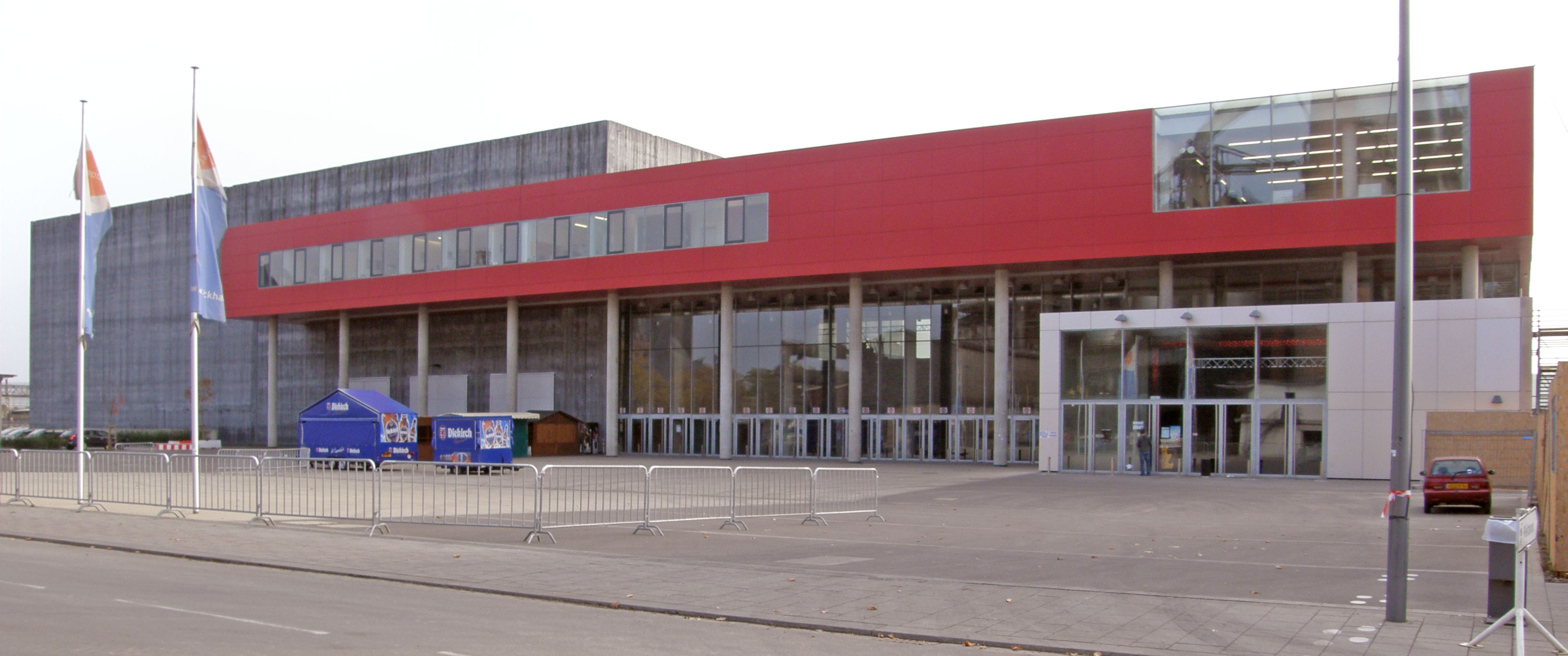
- Front entrance to venue (2007)
- Interactive map of Rockhal
- Full name: Centre de Musiques Amplifiées
- Location: 5 Avenue du Rock'n'Roll; L-4361 Esch-sur-Alzette; Luxembourg
- Coordinates: 49.4998241°N 5.9472513°E
- Owner: Luxembourg Government
- Capacity: 6,500

Construction
- Groundbreaking: 21 July 2003
- Opened: 23 September 2005
- Cost: €30 million
- Architect: BENG Architectes Associés

Website
- www.rockhal.lu

The Rockhal, officially Centre de Musiques Amplifiées, is a concert hall in Esch-sur-Alzette, in southern Luxembourg. It opened on 23 September 2005, has a maximum capacity of 6,500 people and is sited on the former industrial site of Belval in the west of Esch.

== Building ==
The Rockhal consists of four different parts:

- The main hall with a maximum capacity of 6,500 standing places or 2,800 seats on an area of 2625 m^{2};
- The club, the small venue at the Rockhal, with a maximum capacity of 1,100 standing places on an area of 560 m^{2};
- The “Rockhalcafé”, a bar and restaurant, which also hosts smaller shows;
- The Music & Resources Centre with six rehearsal rooms, a recording studio, a dance studio and a documentation centre.

== Entertainment ==
Since its opening, Rockhal has been one of the top entertainment venues in the country, with many international and regional artists having performed at the venue spanning a wide range of music genres. A list of notable concerts held at the venue are listed in the table below; non-concert entertainment events are also included.

Notable entertainment events held at the Rockhal
Year	Date	Nationality	Artists	Tours
2005	September 24	United Kingdom; United States	The Prodigy; Korn	Opening Ceremony of Rockhal
2007	May 20	United Kingdom	Deep Purple	Rapture of the Deep Tour
2007	May 26	United Kingdom	Muse	Black Holes and Revelations Tour
2007	June 11	United States	Marilyn Manson	Rape of the World Tour
2007	June 15	United States	Dream Theater	Chaos in Motion Tour
2007	July 5	United Kingdom	Keane	Under the Iron Sea Tour
2007	July 6	France	Daft Punk	Alive 2006/2007 Tour
2007	October 7	United States	Gwen Stefani	The Sweet Escape Tour
2008	June 5	Australia	Kylie Minogue	KylieX2008
2008	June 9	Canada	Avril Lavigne	The Best Damn World Tour
2008	June 10	Germany	Die Ärzte	Jazzfäst
2008	June 11	United Kingdom	Judas Priest	2008/2009 World Tour
2008	June 26	United States	Kiss	Alive 35 World Tour
2008	October 8	United Kingdom	Queen + Paul Rodgers	Rock the Cosmos Tour
2008	December 12	United States	Slipknot	All Hope Is Gone World Tour
2009	February 15	United States	The Pussycat Dolls	Doll Domination Tour
2009	May 6	United Kingdom	Depeche Mode	Tour of the Universe
2009	July 6	United States	Katy Perry	Hello Katy Tour
2009	July 9	United States	Nine Inch Nails	Wave Goodbye Tour
2009	June 13	United Kingdom	Pet Shop Boys	Pandemonium Tour
2009	July 11	United Kingdom	Snow Patrol	Taking Back the Cities Tour
2009	December 4	Germany	Rammstein	Liebe ist für alle da Tour
2009	December 5	United States	Pink	Funhouse Tour
2009	December 20	United States	Marilyn Manson	The High End of Low Tour
2010	January 27	United States	Daughtry	Leave This Town Tour
2010	January 27	United States	Nickelback	Dark Horse Tour
2010	January 30	Canada	Billy Talent	III Tour
2010	February 22	Germany	Tokio Hotel	Welcome To The Humanoid City World Tour
2010	April 23	Canada	Sum 41	Screaming Bloody Murder Tour
2010	May 4	Barbados	Rihanna	Last Girl on Earth Tour
2010	June 7	United States	Them Crooked Vultures	Deserve the Future Tour
2010	July 5	United States	Slash	Slash 2010–11 World Tour
2010	November 21	Germany	Scorpions	Get Your Sting and Blackout World Tour
2011	June 5	United States	Korn	Ballroom Blitz Tour
2011	June 6	Spain	Enrique Iglesias	Euphoria Tour
2011	June 17	United Kingdom	Ozzy Osbourne	Scream World Tour
2011	June 21	United States	Rob Zombie	Hellbilly Deluxe 2 World Tour
2011	July 6	United States	Journey	Eclipse Tour
2011	July 9	United States	Cyndi Lauper	Memphis Blues Tour
2011	July 13	United States	Prince	Welcome 2
2011	October 17	United States	Bruno Mars	The Doo-Wops & Hooligans Tour
2011	October 21	United States	Bob Dylan	Never Ending Tour 2011
2011	November 4	Netherlands	Within Temptation	The Unforgiving Tour
2011	December 1	United States	Machine Head	The Eighth Plague Tour
2011	December 1	United Kingdom	Bring Me the Horizon	There Is a Hell... Tour
2012	February 27	France	Justice	Justice World Tour 2012
2012	February 29	United States	Dream Theater	A Dramatic Turn of Events Tour
2012	March 12	United Kingdom	Sting	Back to Bass Tour
2012	March 15	United States	Korn	The Path of Totality Tour
2012	April 21	Finland	Nightwish	Imaginaerum World Tour
2012	June 12	United States	Slash	Apocalyptic Love World Tour
2012	June 13	United States	Rise Against	Endgame Tour
2012	June 15	United States	Pitbull	Planet Pit World Tour
2012	July 14	United States	Blink-182	20th Anniversary Tour (Blink-182)
2012	November 2	Ireland	The Cranberries	Roses Tour
2012	November 8	United Kingdom	Deep Purple	The Songs That Built Rock Tour
2012	November 11	Canada	Alanis Morissette	Guardian Angel Tour
2012	November 16	Germany	Scorpions	Get Your Sting and Blackout World Tour
2012	November 28	United Kingdom	Florence + the Machine	Ceremonials Tour
2012	December 1	United States	Marilyn Manson	Hey Cruel World... Tour
2012	December 2	Germany	Rammstein	Made in Germany 1995–2011 (tour)
2013	February 28	United Kingdom	Two Door Cinema Club	Beacon World Tour
2013	March 20	United Kingdom	Emeli Sande	Our Version of Events Tour
2013	April 11	United States	OneRepublic	Native Tour
2013	April 16 - April 21	—N/a	We Will Rock You: 10th Anniversary Tour	
2013	June 2	United States	Alicia Keys	Set the World on Fire Tour
2013	June 6	United States	The Killers	Battle Born World Tour
2013	June 12	United States	Lindsey Stirling	Lindsey Stirling 2012/2013 Tour
2013	July 11	United States	Neil Young with Crazy Horse	Alchemy Tour with Crazy Horse
2013	October 18	United States	Bruno Mars	Moonshine Jungle Tour
2013	November 16	United States	Bob Dylan	Never Ending Tour 2013
2013	November 30	United States	Imagine Dragons	Night Visions Tour
2014	March 1	United Kingdom	James Arthur	James Arthur Tour
2014	March 4	United States	The Pretty Reckless	Going to Hell Tour
2014	April 1	United Kingdom	Deep Purple	Now What? World Tour
2014	May 16	United States	Nine Inch Nails	Twenty Thirteen Tour
2014	October 18	United States	Lindsey Stirling	Lindsey Stirling 2014/2015 Tour
2015	March 5	Netherlands	Within Temptation	Hydra World Tour
2015	March 27	United States	Lionel Richie	All the Hits, All Night Long
2015	June 14	Ireland	The Script	No Sound Without Silence Tour
2015	June 15	United Kingdom	Judas Priest	Redeemer of Souls Tour
2015	June 15	United States	OneRepublic	Native Tour
2015	June 17	United States	Slash	World on Fire World Tour
2015	November 18	Germany	Zedd	True Colors Tour
2015	December 16	Finland	Nightwish	Endless Forms Most Beautiful World Tour
2016	January 14	United States	Imagine Dragons	Smoke + Mirrors Tour
2016	February 29	United Kingdom	Ellie Goulding	Delirium World Tour
2016	March 12	Germany	Scorpions	Get Your Sting and Blackout World Tour
2016	March 26	United States	Mariah Carey	The Sweet Sweet Fantasy Tour
2016	June 5	United States	Pentatonix	2016 World Tour
2016	June 12	United States	Chris Brown	One Hell of a Nite Tour
2016	June 16	United States	Megadeth	
2016	June 21	Sweden	Amon Amarth	—N/a
2016	June 25	United States	Joe Satriani	The Shockwave Tour
2016	June 29	United States	The Kills	
2016	July 2	United States	Patti Smith	
2016	July 13	Canada	Mac Demarco	
2016	August 2	United Kingdom	Iron Maiden	The Book of Souls World Tour
2016	September 24	France	MHD	—N/a
2016	September 29	Canada	Nickelback	No Fixed Address Tour
2016	October 7	The Australian Pink Floyd Show		
2016	October 13	Italy	Laura Pausini	Pausini Stadi Tour 2016
2016	October 18	United States	Dead Kennedys	—N/a
2016	October 21	Poland	Behemoth	—N/a
2016	October 24	Sweden	Katatonia	—N/a
2016	October 26	United States	Fifth Harmony	The 7/27 Tour
2016	November 9	France	Kendji Girac	—N/a
2016	November 11	United States	Red Hot Chili Peppers	The Getaway World Tour
2016	December 16	Germany	Nena	
2017	February 7	France	Benjamin Biolay	
2017	May 27	United Kingdom	Deep Purple	
2018	June 19	Colombia	Shakira	El Dorado World Tour
2018	November 20	Netherlands	Within Temptation	The Resist Tour
2019	March 19	United Kingdom	Jess Glynne	Always In Between Tour
2019	March 20	United States	Nicki Minaj	The Nicki Wrld Tour
2019	October 13	Australia	King Gizzard & the Lizard Wizard	World Tour '19
2019	December 2	Sweden	Amon Amarth	Berserker World Tour
2019	December 17	Sweden	Ghost	A Pale Tour Named Death
2022	June 26	United Kingdom	Gorillaz	World Tour 2022
2022	July 15	United States	Alicia Keys	Alicia + Keys World Tour
2022	August 2	Australia	Nick Cave and the Bad Seeds	Summer 2022 Tour
2022	October 9	United Kingdom	Deep Purple	Whoosh! Tour
2022	October 20	Sweden	Amon Amarth	Vikings and Lionhearts Tour
2022	October 24	Finland	The Rasmus	Live and Never Die Tour
2022	October 26	Iceland	Sigur Rós	World Tour 2022
2022	November 4	United Kingdom	Placebo	Never Let Me Go Tour
2022	November 12	United Kingdom	Sting	My Songs Tour
2023	February 26	France	Gojira	Fortitude Tour
2023	April 30	Italy	Måneskin	Loud Kids Get Louder Tour
2023	June 14	United States	Slipknot	The End, So Far
2023	August 16	United States	Macklemore	The Ben Tour
2023	December 9	United Kingdom	Sting	My Songs Tour
2024	January 27	Luxembourg Song Contest for the Eurovision Song Contest 2024		
2024	May 21	United Kingdom	Yes	The Classic Tales of Yes Tour
2024	May 24	France	MC Solaar	
2024	October 28	United States	Bob Dylan	Rough and Rowdy Ways World Wide Tour
2024	October 31	United Kingdom	Deep Purple	=1 More Time Tour
2025	January 25	Luxembourg Song Contest for the Eurovision Song Contest 2025		
2025	March 1	South Korea	Kiss of Life	Kiss Road
2026	January 24	Luxembourg Song Contest for the Eurovision Song Contest 2026		
