= Never Ending Tour 2011 =

2011 concert tour by Bob Dylan

- Tour by Bob Dylan
- Tour poster, 2011
- Start date: April 3, 2011
- End date: November 21, 2011
- Legs: 4
- No. of shows: 89

Bob Dylan concert chronology
- Never Ending Tour (2010); Never Ending Tour (2011); Never Ending Tour (2012)

The Never Ending Tour is the popular name for Bob Dylan's endless touring schedule since June 7, 1988. In 2011, Dylan played a total of 89 shows, split across four legs, with shows in Asia, Oceania, Europe, and the US.

== Background ==
The tour started off with a concert in Taiwan, the first of Dylan's career. Then he, along with his band, performed two concerts in China, one in Beijing and one in Shanghai. These concerts were controversial and deemed by the media as Dylan 'selling out'. Dylan however did not see it that way at all. The concerts amongst the Chinese audience were successful.

After completing a tour of Asia and moving across to Australia and New Zealand, Dylan and the band performed an 11 date tour of Europe visiting several festivals such as Live at the Marquee, London Feis, Summer Sound Festival, Bergen Calling and Peace & Love.

Dylan and the band toured the United States during July and August performing 28 concerts in 22 States. Dylan performed as part of the Orange County Fair in Costa Mesa, California, on July 15 and Meadow Brooks Music Festival in Rochester Hills, Michigan, on August 7. Dylan returned to Europe in the fall of the year to perform a string of concerts with Mark Knopfler.

== Set lists ==
Asia set lists

Taipei, Taiwan

1. "Gotta Serve Somebody"
2. "It Ain’t Me Babe"
3. "Things Have Changed"
4. "Sugar Baby"
5. "Cold Irons Bound"
6. "Simple Twist of Fate"
7. "Honest With Me"
8. "Desolation Row"
9. "Tweedle Dee & Tweedle Dum"
10. "Forgetful Heart"
11. "Highway 61 Revisited"
12. "Tryin’ To Get To Heaven"
13. "Jolene"
14. "Ballad of a Thin Man"
  Encore
15. "Like a Rolling Stone"
16. "Blowin’ In the Wind"

Beijing, China

1. "Gonna Change My Way of Thinking"
2. "It's All Over Now, Baby Blue"
3. "Beyond Here Lies Nothin’"
4. "Tangled Up In Blue"
5. "Honest With Me"
6. "Simple Twist of Fate"
7. "Tweedle Dee & Tweedle Dum"
8. "Love Sick"
9. "Rollin’ & Tumblin’"
10. "A Hard Rain's A-Gonna Fall"
11. "Highway 61 Revisited"
12. "Spirit on the Water"
13. "Thunder on the Mountain"
14. "Ballad of a Thin Man"
  Encore
15. "Like a Rolling Stone"
16. "All Along the Watchtower"
  Encore
17. "Forever Young"

Shanghai, China

1. "Gonna Change My Way of Thinking"
2. "Don’t Think Twice, it's Alright"
3. "Things Have Changed"
4. "Tangled Up In Blue"
5. "Honest With Me"
6. "Simple Twist of Fate"
7. "Tweedle Dee & Tweedle Dee"
8. "Blind Willie McTell"
9. "The Levee's Gonna Break"
10. "Desolation Row"
11. "Highway 61 Revisited"
12. "Spirit on the Water"
13. "Thunder on the Mountain"
14. "Ballad of a Thin Man"
  Encore
15. "Like a Rolling Stone"
16. "Forever Young"

Ho Chi Minh City, Vietnam

1. "Gonna Change My Way of Thinking"
2. "It Ain’t Me Babe"
3. "Beyond Here Lies Nothin’"
4. "Tangled Up In Blue"
5. "Honest With Me"
6. "Simple Twist of Fate"
7. "Tweedle Dee & Tweedle Dum"
8. "Love Sick"
9. "The Levee's Gonna Break"
10. "A Hard Rain's A-Gonna Fall"
11. "Highway 61 Revisited"
12. "Spirit on the Water"
13. "My Wife's Hometown"
14. "Jolene"
15. "Ballad of a Thin Man"
  Encore
16. "Like a Rolling Stone"
17. "All Along the Watchtower"
  Encore
18. "Forever Young"

Hong Kong, China (First Night)

1. "Gonna Change My Way of Thinking"
2. "Senor (Tales of Yankee Power)"
3. "Just Like Tom Thumb's Blues"
4. "Tangled Up In Blue"
5. "Honest With Me"
6. "Simple Twist of Fate"
7. "Tweedle Dee & Tweedle Dum"
8. "Blind Willie McTell"
9. "Jolene"
10. "Desolation Row"
11. "Highway 61 Revisited"
12. "Spirit on the Water"
13. "My Wife's Hometown"
14. "Thunder on the Mountain"
15. "Ballad of a Thin Man"
  Encore
16. "Like a Rolling Stone"
17. "Forever Young"

Hong Kong, China (Second Night)

1. "Gonna Change My Way of Thinking"
2. "It Ain’t Me Babe"
3. "Things Have Changed"
4. "Tangled Up In Blue"
5. "Rollin’ & Tumblin’"
6. "Simple Twist of Fate"
7. "High Water (For Charley Patton)"
8. "A Hard Rain's A-Gonna Fall"
9. "The Levee's Gonna Break"
10. "If You Ever Go To Houston"
11. "Highway 61 Revisited"
12. "Spirit on the Water"
13. "My Wife's Hometown"
14. "Thunder on the Mountain"
15. "Ballad of a Thin Man"
  Encore
16. "Like a Rolling Stone"
17. "Forever Young"

Marina Promenade, Singapore

1. "Gonna Change My Way of Thinking"
2. "It Ain’t Me Babe"
3. "Beyond Here Lies Nothin’"
4. "Tangled Up In Blue"
5. "Honest With Me"
6. "Simple Twist of Fate"
7. "Tweedle Dee & Tweedle Dum"
8. "A Hard Rain's A-Gonna Fall"
9. "Highway 61 Revisited"
10. "Love Sick"
11. "Thunder on the Mountain"
12. "Ballad of a Thin Man"
  Encore
13. "Like a Rolling Stone"
14. "Forever Young"

Oceania Setlists

Fremantle, Australia

1. "Gonna Change My Way Of Thinking"
2. "Don't Think Twice, It's Alright"
3. "Things Have Changed"
4. "The Levee's Gonna Break"
5. "High Water (For Charley Patton)"
6. "Simple Twist Of Fate"
7. "Rollin' & Tumblin'"
8. "A Hard Rain's A-Gonna Fall"
9. "Highway 61 Revisited"
10. "Tangled Up In Blue"
11. "Thunder On The Mountain"
12. "Ballad Of A Thin Man"
  Encore
13. "Like A Rolling Stone"
14. "Forever Young"

Adelaide, Australia

1. "Gonna Change My Way Of Thinking"
2. "Senor (Tales Of Yankee Power)"
3. "I'll Be Your Baby, Tonight"
4. "Beyond Here Lies Nothin'"
5. "Tweedle Dee & Tweedle Dum"
6. "Simple Twist Of Fate"
7. "The Levee's Gonna Break"
8. "A Hard Rain's A-Gonna Fall"
9. "High Water (For Charley Patton)"
10. "Tryin' To Get To Heaven"
11. "Jolene"
12. "Tangled Up In Blue"
13. "Highway 61 Revisited"
14. "Ballad Of A Thin Man"
  Encore
15. "Like A Rolling Stone"
16. "All Along The Watchtower"
17. "Forever Young"

Melbourne, Australia (first night)

1. "Gonna Change My Way Of Thinking"
2. "Don't Think Twice, It's Alright"
3. "Just Like Tom Thumb's Blues"
4. "Things Have Changed"
5. "Tweedle Dee & Tweedle Dum"
6. "Tangled Up In Blue"
7. "Rollin' & Tumblin'"
8. "Forgetful Heart"
9. "High Water (For Charley Patton)"
10. "Desolation Row"
11. "Highway 61 Revisited"
12. "Simple Twist Of Fate"
13. "Thunder On The Mountain"
14. "Ballad Of A Thin Man"
  Encore
15. "Like A Rolling Stone"
16. "Forever Young"

Melbourne, Australia (second night)

1. "Gonna Change My Way Of Thinking"
2. "Senor (Tales Of Yankee Power)"
3. "I Don't Believe You (She Acts Like We Never Met)"
4. "Things Have Changed"
5. "Tweedle Dee & Tweedle Dum"
6. "Tangled Up In Blue"
7. "The Levee's Gonna Break"
8. "Not Dark Yet"
9. "High Water (For Charley Patton)"
10. "A Hard Rain's A-Gonna Fall"
11. "Highway 61 Revisited"
12. "Simple Twist Of Fate"
13. "Thunder On The Mountain"
14. "Ballad Of A Thin Man"
  Encore
15. "Like A Rolling Stone"
16. "All Along The Watchtower"
17. "Forever Young"

Wollongong, Australia

1. "Gonna Change My Way Of Thinking"
2. "This Wheel's On Fire"
3. "Just Like Tom Thumb's Blues"
4. "Things Have Changed"
5. "Tweedle Dee & Tweedle Dum"
6. "Tangled Up In Blue"
7. "Summer Days"
8. "Blind Willie McTell"
9. "Cold Irons Bound"
10. "Desolation Row"
11. "Highway 61 Revisited"
12. "Spirit On The Water"
13. "Thunder On The Mountain"
14. "Ballad Of A Thin Man"
  Encore
15. "Like A Rolling Stone"
16. "Forever Young"

Byron Bay, Australia (first night)

1. "Gonna Change My Way Of Thinking"
2. "Don't Think Twice, It's Alright"
3. "The Levee's Gonna Break"
4. "Tangled Up In Blue"
5. "Tweedle Dee & Tweedle Dum"
6. "Tryin' To Get To Heaven"
7. "High Water (For Charley Patton)"
8. "A Hard Rain's A-Gonna Fall"
9. "Summer Days"
10. "Simple Twist of Fate"
11. "Highway 61 Revisited"
12. "Ballad Of A Thin Man"
  Encore
13. "Like A Rolling Stone"
14. "Forever Young"

Byron Bay, Australia (second night)

1. "Gonna Change My Way Of Thinking"
2. "It Ain't Me, Babe"
3. "Rollin' & Tumblin'"
4. "Tangled Up In Blue"
5. "Tweedle Dee & Tweedle Dum"
6. "Spirit On The Water"
7. "Cold Irons Bound"
8. "Desolation Row"
9. "Summer Days"
10. "Simple Twist Of Fate"
11. "Highway 61 Revisited"
12. "Ballad Of A Thin Man"
  Encore
13. "Like A Rolling Stone"
14. "Forever Young"

Sydney, Australia (first night)

1. "Gonna Change My Way Of Thinking"
2. "Senor (Tales Of Yankee Power)"
3. "Just Like Tom Thumb's Blues"
4. "Tangled Up In Blue"
5. "Jolene"
6. "Forgetful Heart"
7. "Tweedle Dee & Tweedle Dum"
8. "A Hard Rain's A-Gonna Fall"
9. "Cold Irons Bound"
10. "When The Deal Goes Down"
11. "The Levee's Gonna Break"
12. "Simple Twist Of Fate"
13. "Highway 61 Revisited"
14. "Ballad Of A Thin Man"
  Encore
15. "Like A Rolling Stone"
16. "All Along The Watchtower"
17. "Forever Young"

Sydney, Australia (second night)

1. "Gonna Change My Way Of Thinking"
2. "It's All Over Now, Baby Blue"
3. "I'll Be Your Baby Tonight"
4. "Things Have Changed"
5. "Rollin' & Tumblin'"
6. "Tangled Up In Blue"
7. "Tweedle Dee & Tweedle Dum"
8. "Desolation Row"
9. "High Water (For Charley Patton)"
10. "Spirit On The Water"
11. "Summer Days"
12. "Simple Twist Of Fate"
13. "Highway 61 Revisited"
14. "Ballad Of A Thin Man"
  Encore
15. "Like A Rolling Stone"
16. "All Along The Watchtower"
17. "Forever Young"

Auckland, New Zealand

1. "Gonna Change My Way Of Thinking"
2. "This Wheel's On Fire"
3. "Just Like Tom Thumb's Blues"
4. "Beyond Here Lies Nothin'"
5. "Tweedle Dee & Tweedle Dum"
6. "Tangled Up In Blue"
7. "Summer Days"
8. "Blind Willie McTell"
9. "Cold Irons Bound"
10. "Desolation Row"
11. "Highway 61 Revisited"
12. "Spirit On The Water"
13. "Thunder On The Mountain"
14. "Ballad Of A Thin Man"
  Encore
15. "Like A Rolling Stone"
16. "All Along The Watchtower"
17. "Forever Young"

Europe/Middle East Summer Setlists

Cork, Ireland

1. "Gonna Change My Way Of Thinking"
2. "It's All Over Now, Baby Blue"
3. "Things Have Changed"
4. "Tangled Up In Blue"
5. "The Levee's Gonna Break"
6. "Ballad Of Hollis Brown"
7. "Tweedle Dee & Tweedle Dum"
8. "I Dreamed I Saw St. Augustine"
9. "High Water (For Charley Patton)
10. "Tryin' To Get To Heaven"
11. "Highway 61 Revisited"
12. "Simple Twist Of Fate"
13. "Thunder On The Mountain"
14. "Ballad Of A Thin Man"
  Encore
15. "Like A Rolling Stone"
16. "All Along The Watchtower"
17. "Forever Young"

London, England / Tel Aviv, Israel

1. "Gonna Change My Way Of Thinking"
2. "It's All Over Now, Baby Blue"
3. "Things Have Changed"
4. "Tangled Up In Blue"
5. "Summer Days"
6. "Simple Twist Of Fate"
7. "Cold Irons Bound"
8. "A Hard Rain's A-Gonna Fall"
9. "Highway 61 Revisited"
10. "Forgetful Heart"
11. "Thunder On The Mountain"
12. "Ballad Of A Thin Man"
  Encore
13. "Like A Rolling Stone"
14. "All Along The Watchtower"
15. "Blowin' In The Wind"

Milan, Italy

1. "Leopard-Skin Pill-Box Hat"
2. "When I Paint My Masterpiece"
3. "'Til I Fell In Love With You"
4. "I Don't Believe You (She Acts Like We Never Have Met)"
5. "Summer Days"
6. "Spirit On The Water"
7. "Tweedle Dee & Tweedle Dum"
8. "Can't Wait"
9. "The Levee's Gonna Break"
10. "Visions Of Johanna"
11. "Highway 61 Revisited"
12. "Forgetful Heart"
13. "Thunder On The Mountain"
14. "Ballad Of A Thin Man"
  Encore
15. "Like A Rolling Stone"
16. "All Along The Watchtower"
17. "Blowin' In The Wind"

Sursee, Switzerland

1. "Leopard-Skin Pill-Box Hat"
2. "Don't Think Twice, It's Alright"
3. "Things Have Changed"
4. "To Ramona"
5. "Beyond Here Lies Nothin'"
6. "Make You Feel My Love"
7. "Tweedle Dee & Tweedle Dum"
8. "Tangled Up In Blue"
9. "Jolene"
10. "Ballad Of Hollis Brown"
11. "Highway 61 Revisited"
12. "A Hard Rain's A-Gonna Fall"
13. "Thunder On The Mountain"
14. "Ballad Of A Thin Man"
  Encore
15. "Like A Rolling Stone"
16. "All Along The Watchtower"
17. "Blowin' In The Wind"

Mainz, Germany

1. "Rainy Day Women #12 & 35"
2. "Don't Think Twice, It's Alright"
3. "Things Have Changed"
4. "Girl From The North Country"
5. "Beyond Here Lies Nothin'"
6. "The Lonesome Death Of Hattie Carroll"
7. "Summer Days"
8. "Tangled Up In Blue"
9. "The Levee's Gonna Break"
10. "Ballad Of Hollis Brown"
11. "Highway 61 Revisited"
12. "Desolation Row"
13. "Thunder On The Mountain"
14. "Ballad Of A Thin Man"
  Encore
15. "Like A Rolling Stone"
16. "All Along The Watchtower"
17. "Blowin' In The Wind"

Hamburg, Germany

1. "Leopard-Skin Pill-Box Hat"
2. "Don't Think Twice, It's Alright"
3. "Things Have Changed"
4. "I Don't Believe You (She Acts Like We Never Have Met)"
5. "Beyond Here Lies Nothin'"
6. "To Ramona"
7. "Cold Irons Bound"
8. "Tangled Up In Blue"
9. "Summer Days"
10. "Tryin' To Get To Heaven"
11. "Highway 61 Revisited"
12. "Visions of Johanna"
13. "Thunder On The Mountain"
14. "Ballad Of A Thin Man"
  Encore
15. "Like A Rolling Stone"
16. "All Along The Watchtower"
17. "Forever Young"

Odense, Denmark

1. "Rainy Day Women #12 & 35"
2. "The Man In Me"
3. "Things Have Changed"
4. "I'll Be Your Baby Tonight"
5. "Beyond Here Lies Nothin'"
6. "Boots Of Spanish Leather"
7. "Ballad Of Hollis Brown"
8. "Every Grain Of Sand"
9. "Tweedle Dee & Tweedle Dum"
10. "A Hard Rain's A-Gonna Fall"
11. "Highway 61 Revisited"
12. "Forgetful Heart"
13. "Thunder On The Mountain"
14. "Ballad Of A Thin Man"
  Encore
15. "Like A Rolling Stone"
16. "All Along The Watchtower"
17. "Blowin' In The Wind"

Bergen, Norway

1. "Rainy Day Women #12 & 35"
2. "It's All Over Now, Baby Blue"
3. "Things Have Changed"
4. "Tangled Up In Blue"
5. "Beyond Here Lies Nothin'"
6. "Simple Twist Of Fate"
7. "High Water (For Charley Patton)
8. "Tryin' To Get To Heaven"
9. "Tweedle Dee & Tweedle Dum"
10. "Desolation Row"
11. "Highway 61 Revisited"
12. "Forgetful Heart"
13. "Thunder On The Mountain"
14. "Ballad Of A Thin Man"
  Encore
15. "Like A Rolling Stone"
16. "All Along The Watchtower"
17. "Blowin' In The Wind"

Oslo, Norway

1. "Rainy Day Women #12 & 35"
2. "It Ain't Me Babe
3. "Things Have Changed"
4. "Tangled Up In Blue"
5. "Beyond Here Lies Nothin'"
6. "Spirit On The Water"
7. "Ballad Of Hollis Brown"
8. "Simple Twist Of Fate"
9. "Summer Days"
10. "A Hard Rain's A-Gonna Fall"
11. "Highway 61 Revisited"
12. "Forgetful Heart"
13. "Thunder On The Mountain"
14. "Ballad Of A Thin Man"
  Encore
15. "Like A Rolling Stone"
16. "All Along The Watchtower"
17. "Blowin' In The Wind"

Borlänge, Sweden

1. "Rainy Day Women #12 & 35"
2. "Don't Think Twice, It's Alright"
3. "Things Have Changed"
4. "Tangled Up In Blue"
5. "Beyond Here Lies Nothin'"
6. "Simple Twist Of Fate"
7. "Tweedle Dee & Tweedle Dum"
8. "A Hard Rain's A-Gonna Fall"
9. "Highway 61 Revisited"
10. "Tryin' To Get To Heaven"
11. "Thunder On The Mountain"
12. "Ballad Of A Thin Man"
  Encore
13. "Like A Rolling Stone"
14. "All Along The Watchtower"
15. "Blowin' In The Wind"

North America Setlists

Santa Barbara, California

1. "Gonna Change My Way Of Thinking"
2. "Don't Think Twice, It's Alright"
3. "Things Have Changed"
4. "Tangled Up In Blue"
5. "Beyond Here Lies Nothin'"
6. "If You Ever Go To Houston"
7. "High Water (For Charley Patton)
8. "Simple Twist Of Fate"
9. "The Levee's Gonna Break"
10. "A Hard Rain's A-Gonna Fall"
11. "Highway 61 Revisited"
12. "Forgetful Heart"
13. "Thunder On The Mountain"
14. "Ballad Of A Thin Man"
  Encore
15. "Like A Rolling Stone"
16. "All Along The Watchtower
17. "Blowin' In The Wind

Costa Mesa, California

1. "Gonna Change My Way Of Thinking"
2. "Don't Think Twice, It's Alright"
3. "Things Have Changed"
4. "Tangled Up In Blue"
5. "Beyond Here Lies Nothin'"
6. "Sugar Baby"
7. "High Water (For Charley Patton)
8. "Tryin' To Get To Heaven"
9. "Summer Days"
10. "A Hard Rain's A-Gonna Fall"
11. "Highway 61 Revisited"
12. "Forgetful Heart"
13. "Thunder On The Mountain"
14. "Ballad Of A Thin Man"
  Encore
15. "Like A Rolling Stone"
16. "All Along The Watchtower
17. "Blowin' In The Wind

Paradise, Nevada

1. "Leopard-Skin Pill-Box Hat"
2. "It Ain't Me Babe"
3. "Things Have Changed"
4. "Tangled Up In Blue"
5. "Beyond Here Lies Nothin'"
6. "Sugar Baby"
7. "Summer Days"
8. "Simple Twist Of Fate"
9. "Highway 61 Revisited"
10. "Forgetful Heart"
11. "Thunder On The Mountain"
12. "Ballad Of A Thin Man"
  Encore
13. "Like A Rolling Stone"
14. "All Along The Watchtower
15. "Blowin' In The Wind

Phoenix, Arizona

1. "Leopard-Skin Pill-Box Hat"
2. "It Ain't Me Babe"
3. "Things Have Changed"
4. "If You Ever Go To Houston"
5. "Beyond Here Lies Nothin'"
6. "Tangled Up In Blue"
7. "Tweedle Dee & Tweedle Dum"
8. "Sugar Baby"
9. "Summer Days"
10. "Desolation Row"
11. "Highway 61 Revisited"
12. "Simple Twist Of Fate"
13. "Thunder On The Mountain"
14. "Ballad Of A Thin Man"
  Encore
15. "Like A Rolling Stone"
16. "All Along The Watchtower

Tucson, Arizona

1. "Rainy Day Women #12 & 35"
2. "It's All Over Now, Baby Blue"
3. "Things Have Changed"
4. "If You Ever Go To Houston"
5. "Beyond Here Lies Nothin'"
6. "Tangled Up In Blue"
7. "Cold Irons Bound"
8. "Visions Of Johanna"
9. "The Levee's Gonna Break"
10. "Tryin' To Get To Heaven"
11. "Highway 61 Revisited"
12. "Forgetful Heart"
13. "Thunder On The Mountain"
14. "Ballad Of A Thin Man"
  Encore
15. "Like A Rolling Stone"
16. "All Along The Watchtower

Albuquerque, New Mexico

1. "Rainy Day Women #12 & 35"
2. "It's All Over Now, Baby Blue"
3. "Things Have Changed"
4. "If You Ever Go To Houston"
5. "Beyond Here Lies Nothin'"
6. "Tangled Up In Blue"
7. "Cold Irons Bound"
8. "Visions Of Johanna"
9. "Summer Days"
10. "Sugar Baby"
11. "Highway 61 Revisited"
12. "Simple Twist Of Fate"
13. "Thunder On The Mountain"
14. "Ballad Of A Thin Man"
  Encore
15. "Like A Rolling Stone"
16. "All Along The Watchtower
  Encore
17. "Forever Young"

Thackerville, Oklahoma

1. "Rainy Day Women #12 & 35"
2. "It's All Over Now, Baby Blue"
3. "Things Have Changed"
4. "If You Ever Go To Houston"
5. "Beyond Here Lies Nothin'"
6. "Tangled Up In Blue"
7. "Summer Days"
8. "Visions Of Johanna"
9. "Cold Irons Bound"
10. "Sugar Baby"
11. "Highway 61 Revisited"
12. "Simple Twist Of Fate"
13. "Thunder On The Mountain"
14. "Ballad Of A Thin Man"
  Encore
15. "Like A Rolling Stone"
16. "All Along The Watchtower

Canyon Lake, Texas

1. "Rainy Day Women #12 & 35"
2. "Don't Think Twice, It's Alright"
3. "Things Have Changed"
4. "Tangled Up In Blue"
5. "Summer Days"
6. "Sugar Baby"
7. "Cold Irons Bound"
8. "Tryin' To Get To Heaven"
9. "Highway 61 Revisited"
10. "Simple Twist Of Fate"
11. "Thunder On The Mountain"
12. "Ballad Of A Thin Man"
  Encore
13. "Like A Rolling Stone"
14. "All Along The Watchtower
  Encore
15. "Blowin' In The Wind"

New Orleans, Louisiana

1. "Rainy Day Women #12 & 35"
2. "It's All Over Now, Baby Blue"
3. "Things Have Changed"
4. "Tangled Up In Blue"
5. "Beyond Here Lies Nothin'"
6. "Sugar Baby"
7. "Cold Irons Bound"
8. "Simple Twist Of Fate"
9. "Highway 61 Revisited"
10. "Forgetful Heart"
11. "Thunder On The Mountain"
12. "Ballad Of A Thin Man"
  Encore
13. "Like A Rolling Stone"
14. "All Along The Watchtower
  Encore
15. "Blowin' In The Wind"

Pensacola, Florida

1. "Leopard-Skin Pill-Box Hat"
2. "It Ain't Me Babe"
3. "Things Have Changed"
4. "Tangled Up In Blue"
5. "Beyond Here Lies Nothin'"
6. "Mississippi"
7. "High Water (For Charley Patton)
8. "Simple Twist Of Fate"
9. "Highway 61 Revisited"
10. "Forgetful Heart"
11. "Thunder On The Mountain"
12. "Ballad Of A Thin Man"
  Encore
13. "Like A Rolling Stone"
14. "All Along The Watchtower
  Encore
15. "Blowin' In The Wind"

Atlanta, Georgia

1. "Rainy Day Women #12 & 35"
2. "Don't Think Twice, It's Alright"
3. "Things Have Changed"
4. "Tangled Up In Blue"
5. "Beyond Here Lies Nothin'"
6. "Mississippi"
7. "The Levee's Gonna Break"
8. "Sugar Baby"
9. "Highway 61 Revisited"
10. "A Hard Rain's A-Gonna Fall"
11. "Thunder On The Mountain"
12. "Ballad Of A Thin Man"
  Encore
13. "Like A Rolling Stone"
14. "All Along The Watchtower"

Memphis, Tennessee

1. "Leopard-Skin Pill-Box Hat"
2. "Don't Think Twice, It's Alright"
3. "Things Have Changed"
4. "Tangled Up In Blue"
5. "Beyond Here Lies Nothin'"
6. "Mississippi"
7. "The Levee's Gonna Break"
8. "Sugar Baby"
9. "Highway 61 Revisited"
10. "Forgetful Heart"
11. "Thunder On The Mountain"
12. "Ballad Of A Thin Man"
  Encore
13. "Like A Rolling Stone"
14. "All Along The Watchtower"
15. "Blowin' In The Wind"

Nashville, Tennessee

1. "Leopard-Skin Pill-Box Hat"
2. "It's All Over Now, Baby Blue"
3. "Things Have Changed"
4. "Tangled Up In Blue"
5. "Beyond Here Lies Nothin'"
6. "Mississippi"
7. "High Water (For Charley Patton)
8. "Sugar Baby"
9. "Highway 61 Revisited"
10. "Forgetful Heart"
11. "Thunder On The Mountain"
12. "Ballad Of A Thin Man"
  Encore
13. "Like A Rolling Stone"
14. "All Along The Watchtower"
15. "Blowin' In The Wind"

Evansville, Indiana

1. "Rainy Day Women #12 & 35"
2. "It's All Over Now, Baby Blue"
3. "Things Have Changed"
4. "Tangled Up In Blue"
5. "Beyond Here Lies Nothin'"
6. "Mississippi"
7. "Summer Days"
8. "Visions Of Johanna"
9. "Highway 61 Revisited"
10. "Sugar Baby"
11. "Thunder On The Mountain"
12. "Ballad Of A Thin Man"
  Encore
13. "Like A Rolling Stone"
14. "All Along The Watchtower"
15. "Blowin' In The Wind"

Toledo, Ohio

1. "Rainy Day Women #12 & 35"
2. "It's All Over Now, Baby Blue"
3. "Things Have Changed"
4. "Tangled Up In Blue"
5. "Beyond Here Lies Nothin'"
6. "Mississippi"
7. "High Water (For Charley Patton)
8. "Sugar Baby"
9. "The Levee's Gonna Break"
10. "Forgetful Heart"
11. "Thunder On The Mountain"
12. "Ballad Of A Thin Man"
  Encore
13. "Like A Rolling Stone"
14. "All Along The Watchtower
15. "Blowin' In The Wind

Kettering, Ohio

1. "Leopard-Skin Pill-Box Hat"
2. "Girl From The North Country"
3. "Things Have Changed"
4. "Tangled Up In Blue"
5. "Beyond Here Lies Nothin'"
6. "Mississippi"
7. "Tweedle Dee & Tweedle Dum"
8. "Desolation Row"
9. "The Levee's Gonna Break"
10. "Tryin' To Get To Heaven"
11. "Highway 61 Revisited"
12. "Simple Twist Of Fate"
13. "Thunder On The Mountain"
14. "Ballad Of A Thin Man"
  Encore
15. "Like A Rolling Stone"
16. "All Along The Watchtower

Cleveland, Ohio

1. "Rainy Day Women #12 & 35"
2. "To Ramona"
3. "Things Have Changed"
4. "Tangled Up In Blue"
5. "Beyond Here Lies Nothin'"
6. "Mississippi"
7. "Ballad Of Hollis Brown"
8. "The Levee's Gonna Break"
9. "The Lonesome Death Of Hattie Carroll"
10. "Highway 61 Revisited"
11. "Simple Twist Of Fate"
12. "Thunder On The Mountain"
13. "Ballad Of A Thin Man"
  Encore
14. "Like A Rolling Stone"
15. "All Along The Watchtower

Rochester Hills, Michigan

1. "Leopard-Skin Pill-Box Hat"
2. "Don't Think Twice, It's Alright"
3. "Things Have Changed"
4. "Tangled Up In Blue"
5. "Beyond Here Lies Nothin'"
6. "Mississippi"
7. "Tweedle Dee & Tweedle Dum"
8. "Summer Days"
9. "Tryin' To Get To Heaven"
10. "Highway 61 Revisited"
11. "Simple Twist Of Fate"
12. "Thunder On The Mountain"
13. "Ballad Of A Thin Man"
  Encore
14. "Like A Rolling Stone"
15. "All Along The Watchtower

Canandaigua, New York

1. "Leopard-Skin Pill-Box Hat"
2. "Love Minus Zero/No Limit"
3. "Things Have Changed"
4. "Tangled Up In Blue"
5. "Beyond Here Lies Nothin'"
6. "Mississippi"
7. "John Brown"
8. "Summer Days"
9. "Blind Willie McTell"
10. "Highway 61 Revisited"
11. "Simple Twist Of Fate"
12. "Thunder On The Mountain"
13. "Ballad Of A Thin Man"
  Encore
14. "Like A Rolling Stone"
15. "All Along The Watchtower

Scranton, Pennsylvania

1. "Rainy Day Women #12 & 35"
2. "It Ain't Me Babe"
3. "Things Have Changed"
4. "Tangled Up In Blue"
5. "Beyond Here Lies Nothin'"
6. "Mississippi"
7. "High Water (For Charley Patton)
8. "Summer Days"
9. "Desolation Row"
10. "Highway 61 Revisited"
11. "Simple Twist Of Fate"
12. "Thunder On The Mountain"
13. "Ballad Of A Thin Man"
  Encore
14. "Like A Rolling Stone"
15. "All Along The Watchtower

Bethel, New York

1. "Leopard-Skin Pill-Box Hat"
2. "To Ramona"
3. "Things Have Changed"
4. "Tangled Up In Blue"
5. "Beyond Here Lies Nothin'"
6. "Mississippi"
7. "Desolation Row"
8. "Cold Irons Bound"
9. "Blind Willie McTell"
10. "Highway 61 Revisited"
11. "Simple Twist Of Fate"
12. "Thunder On The Mountain"
13. "Ballad Of A Thin Man"
  Encore
14. "Like A Rolling Stone"
15. "All Along The Watchtower

Wantagh, New York

1. "Leopard-Skin Pill-Box Hat"
2. "To Ramona"
3. "Things Have Changed"
4. "Tangled Up In Blue"
5. "Beyond Here Lies Nothin'"
6. "Mississippi"
7. "Ballad Of Hollis Brown"
8. "The Levee's Gonna Break"
9. "The Lonesome Death Of Hattie Carroll"
10. "Highway 61 Revisited"
11. "Simple Twist Of Fate"
12. "Thunder On The Mountain"
13. "Ballad Of A Thin Man"
  Encore
14. "Like A Rolling Stone"
15. "All Along The Watchtower

Asbury Park, New Jersey

1. "Leopard-Skin Pill-Box Hat"
2. "To Ramona"
3. "Things Have Changed"
4. "Tangled Up In Blue"
5. "Beyond Here Lies Nothin'"
6. "Mississippi"
7. "High Water (For Charley Patton)
8. "Summer Days"
9. "Blind Willie McTell"
10. "Highway 61 Revisited"
11. "Simple Twist Of Fate"
12. "Thunder On The Mountain"
13. "Ballad Of A Thin Man"
  Encore
14. "Like A Rolling Stone"
15. "All Along The Watchtower

Columbia, Maryland

1. "Rainy Day Women #12 & 35"
2. "It's All Over Now, Baby Blue"
3. "Things Have Changed"
4. "Tangled Up In Blue"
5. "Beyond Here Lies Nothin'"
6. "Mississippi"
7. "John Brown"
8. "Summer Days"
9. "Cold Irons Bound"
10. "Highway 61 Revisited"
11. "Simple Twist Of Fate"
12. "Thunder On The Mountain"
13. "Ballad Of A Thin Man"
  Encore
14. "Like A Rolling Stone"
15. "All Along The Watchtower

Philadelphia, Pennsylvania

1. "Leopard-Skin Pill-Box Hat"
2. "Don't Think Twice, It's Alright"
3. "Things Have Changed"
4. "Tangled Up In Blue"
5. "Beyond Here Lies Nothin'"
6. "Mississippi"
7. "The Levee's Gonna Break"
8. "Desolation Row"
9. "Blind Willie McTell"
10. "Highway 61 Revisited"
11. "Simple Twist Of Fate"
12. "Thunder On The Mountain"
13. "Ballad Of A Thin Man"
  Encore
14. "Like A Rolling Stone"
15. "All Along The Watchtower

Gilford, New Hampshire

1. "Leopard-Skin Pill-Box Hat"
2. "To Ramona"
3. "Things Have Changed"
4. "Tangled Up In Blue"
5. "Beyond Here Lies Nothin'"
6. "Mississippi"
7. "Desolation Row"
8. "High Water (For Charley Patton)
9. "Spirit On The Water"
10. "Highway 61 Revisited"
11. "Simple Twist Of Fate"
12. "Thunder On The Mountain"
13. "Ballad Of A Thin Man"
  Encore
14. "Like A Rolling Stone"
15. "All Along The Watchtower

Bangor, Maine

1. "Rainy Day Women #12 & 35"
2. "Don't Think Twice, It's Alright"
3. "Things Have Changed"
4. "Tangled Up In Blue"
5. "Beyond Here Lies Nothin'"
6. "Mississippi"
7. "The Lonesome Death Of Hattie Carroll"
8. "Ballad Of Hollis Brown"
9. "Simple Twist Of Fate"
10. "Highway 61 Revisited"
11. "Blind Willie McTell"
12. "Thunder On The Mountain"
13. "Ballad Of A Thin Man"
  Encore
14. "Like A Rolling Stone"
15. "All Along The Watchtower

Boston, Massachusetts

1. "Leopard-Skin Pill-Box Hat"
2. "Don't Think Twice, It's Alright"
3. "Things Have Changed"
4. "Tangled Up In Blue"
5. "Beyond Here Lies Nothin'"
6. "Mississippi"
7. "Summer Days"
8. "Tryin' To Get To Heaven"
9. "High Water (For Charley Patton)
10. "Simple Twist Of Fate"
11. "Highway 61 Revisited"
12. "Blind Willie McTell"
13. "Thunder On The Mountain"
14. "Ballad Of A Thin Man"
  Encore
15. "Like A Rolling Stone"
16. "All Along The Watchtower
17. "Blowin' In The Wind

Europe Fall Setlists

Dublin, Ireland

1. "Leopard Skin Pillbox Hat"
2. "Don't Think Twice, It's Alright"
3. "Things Have Changed"
4. "Tangled Up In Blue"
5. "Beyond Here Lies Nothin'"
6. "Spirit On The Water"
7. "The Levee's Gonna Break"
8. "Desolation Row"
9. "Highway 61 Revisited"
10. "Forgetful Heart"
11. "Thunder On The Mountain"
12. "Ballad Of A Thin Man"
  Encore
13. "Like A Rolling Stone"
14. "All Along The Watchtower"

Glasgow, Scotland (First Night)

1. "Leopard Skin Pillbox Hat"
2. "It's All Over Now, Baby Blue"
3. "Things Have Changed"
4. "Tangled Up In Blue"
5. "Honest With Me"
6. "The Lonesome Death Of Hattie Carroll"
7. "Summer Days"
8. "A Hard Rain's A-Gonna Fall"
9. "Highway 61 Revisited"
10. "Tryin' To Get To Heaven"
11. "Thunder On The Mountain"
12. "Ballad Of A Thin Man"
  Encore
13. "Like A Rolling Stone"
14. "All Along The Watchtower"

Glasgow, Scotland (Second Night)

1. "Leopard Skin Pillbox Hat"
2. "It Ain't Me Babe"
3. "Things Have Changed"
4. "Tangled Up In Blue"
5. "Cold Irons Bound"
6. "Simple Twist Of Fate"
7. "Honest With Me"
8. "Desolation Row"
9. "Highway 61 Revisited"
10. "Blind Willie McTell"
11. "Thunder On The Mountain"
12. "Ballad Of A Thin Man"
  Encore
13. "Like A Rolling Stone"
14. "All Along The Watchtower"

Manchester, England

1. "Leopard Skin Pillbox Hat"
2. "Don't Think Twice, It's Alright"
3. "Things Have Changed"
4. "Tangled Up In Blue"
5. "Honest With Me"
6. "Simple Twist Of Fate"
7. "Summer Days"
8. "A Hard Rain's A-Gonna Fall"
9. "Highway 61 Revisited"
10. "Forgetful Heart"
11. "Thunder On The Mountain"
12. "Ballad Of A Thin Man"
  Encore
13. "Like A Rolling Stone"
14. "All Along The Watchtower"

Nottingham, England

1. "Leopard Skin Pillbox Hat"
2. "Love Sick"
3. "Just Like Tom Thumb's Blues"
4. "Can't Wait"
5. "Watching The River Flow"
6. "Not Dark Yet"
7. "High Water (For Charley Patton)"
8. "Visions Of Johanna"
9. "Highway 61 Revisited"
10. "Nettie Moore"
11. "Thunder On The Mountain"
12. "Ballad Of A Thin Man"
13. "All Along The Watchtower"
14. "Like A Rolling Stone"

Cardiff, Wales

1. "Leopard Skin Pillbox Hat"
2. "Shooting Star"
3. "Things Have Changed"
4. "Man In The Long Black Coat"
5. "Watching The River Flow"
6. "High Water (For Charley Patton)"
7. "Summer Days"
8. "A Hard Rain's A-Gonna Fall"
9. "Highway 61 Revisited"
10. "Tryin' To Get To Heaven"
11. "Thunder On The Mountain"
12. "Ballad Of A Thin Man"
13. "All Along The Watchtower"
14. "Like A Rolling Stone"

Bournemouth, England

1. "Leopard Skin Pillbox Hat"
2. "This Wheels On Fire"
3. "I'll Be Your Baby Tonight"
4. "Tangled Up In Blue"
5. "Beyond Here Lies Nothin'"
6. "Make You Feel My Love"
7. "Honest With Me"
8. "Desolation Row"
9. "Highway 61 Revisited"
10. "Blind Willie McTell"
11. "Thunder On The Mountain"
12. "Ballad Of A Thin Man"
13. "All Along The Watchtower"
14. "Like A Rolling Stone"

Lille, France

1. "Leopard Skin Pillbox Hat"
2. "Don't Think Twice, It's Alright"
3. "Things Have Changed"
4. "Tangled Up In Blue"
5. "Honest With Me"
6. "Not Dark Yet"
7. "Jolene"
8. "A Hard Rain's A-Gonna Fall"
9. "Highway 61 Revisited"
10. "Tryin' To Get To Heaven"
11. "Thunder On The Mountain"
12. "Ballad Of A Thin Man"
13. "All Along The Watchtower"
14. "Like A Rolling Stone"
  Encore
15. "Forever Young"

Paris, France

1. "Leopard Skin Pillbox Hat"
2. "It's All Over Now, Baby Blue"
3. "Things Have Changed"
4. "Tangled Up In Blue"
5. "Honest With Me"
6. "Spirit On The Water"
7. "Summer Days"
8. "Desolation Row"
9. "Highway 61 Revisited"
10. "Blind Willie McTell"
11. "Thunder On The Mountain"
12. "Ballad Of A Thin Man"
13. "All Along The Watchtower"
14. "Like A Rolling Stone"

Antwerp, Belgium

1. "Leopard Skin Pillbox Hat"
2. "Love Sick"
3. "Just Like Tom Thumb's Blues"
4. "Can't Wait"
5. "Summer Days"
6. "Not Dark Yet"
7. "High Water (For Charley Patton)"
8. "A Hard Rain's A-Gonna Fall"
9. "Highway 61 Revisited"
10. "Forgetful Heart"
11. "Thunder On The Mountain"
12. "Ballad Of A Thin Man"
13. "All Along The Watchtower"
14. "Like A Rolling Stone"

Rotterdam, The Netherlands

1. "Leopard Skin Pillbox Hat"
2. "It Ain't Me Babe"
3. "Things Have Changed"
4. "Mississippi"
5. "The Levee's Gonna Break"
6. "A Hard Rain's A-Gonna Fall"
7. "High Water (For Charley Patton)"
8. "Blind Willie McTell"
9. "Highway 61 Revisited"
10. "Workingman's Blues #2"
11. "Thunder On The Mountain"
12. "Ballad Of A Thin Man"
13. "All Along The Watchtower"
14. "Like A Rolling Stone"

Esch, Luxembourg

1. "Leopard Skin Pillbox Hat"
2. "Don't Think Twice, It's Alright"
3. "Things Have Changed"
4. "Tangled Up In Blue"
5. "Honest With Me"
6. "Make You Feel My Love"
7. "The Levee's Gonna Break"
8. "Desolation Row"
9. "Highway 61 Revisited"
10. "Forgetful Heart"
11. "Thunder On The Mountain"
12. "Ballad Of A Thin Man"
13. "All Along The Watchtower"
14. "Like A Rolling Stone"

Oberhausen, Germany

1. "Leopard Skin Pillbox Hat"
2. "It Ain't Me Babe"
3. "Blind Willie McTell"
4. "Things Have Changed"
5. "Spirit On The Water"
6. "Love Sick"
7. "The Levee's Gonna Break"
8. "A Hard Rain's A-Gonna Fall"
9. "Highway 61 Revisited"
10. "Tryin' To Get To Heaven"
11. "Thunder On The Mountain"
12. "Ballad Of A Thin Man"
13. "All Along The Watchtower"
14. "Like A Rolling Stone"

Mannheim, Germany

1. "Leopard Skin Pillbox Hat"
2. "Don't Think Twice, It's Alright"
3. "Things Have Changed"
4. "Mississippi"
5. "John Brown"
6. "Spirit On The Water"
7. "Summer Days"
8. "Desolation Row"
9. "Highway 61 Revisited"
10. "Forgetful Heart"
11. "Thunder On The Mountain"
12. "Ballad Of A Thin Man"
13. "All Along The Watchtower"
14. "Like A Rolling Stone"

Munich, Germany

1. "Leopard Skin Pillbox Hat"
2. "It Ain't Me Babe"
3. "Things Have Changed"
4. "Man In The Long Black Coat"
5. "Summer Days"
6. "Simple Twist Of Fate"
7. "High Water (For Charley Patton)"
8. "A Hard Rain's A-Gonna Fall"
9. "Highway 61 Revisited"
10. "Forgetful Heart"
11. "Thunder On The Mountain"
12. "Ballad Of A Thin Man"
13. "All Along The Watchtower"
14. "Like A Rolling Stone"
  Encore
15. "Blowin' In The Wind"

Leipzig, Germany

1. "Leopard Skin Pillbox Hat"
2. "Girl From The North Country"
3. "Things Have Changed"
4. "Tangled Up In Blue"
5. "The Levee's Gonna Break"
6. "Love Sick"
7. "High Water (For Charley Patton)"
8. "Tryin' To Get To Heaven"
9. "Highway 61 Revisited"
10. "A Hard Rain's A-Gonna Fall"
11. "Thunder On The Mountain"
12. "Ballad Of A Thin Man"
13. "All Along The Watchtower"
14. "Like A Rolling Stone"

Berlin, Germany

1. "Leopard Skin Pillbox Hat"
2. "It's All Over Now, Baby Blue"
3. "Things Have Changed"
4. "Mississippi"
5. "Summer Days"
6. "The Lonesome Death Of Hattie Carroll"
7. "Ballad Of Hollis Brown"
8. "Desolation Row"
9. "Highway 61 Revisited"
10. "Nettie Moore"
11. "Thunder On The Mountain"
12. "Ballad Of A Thin Man"
13. "All Along The Watchtower"
14. "Like A Rolling Stone"

Hamburg, Germany

1. "Leopard Skin Pillbox Hat"
2. "Boots Of Spanish Leather"
3. "Things Have Changed"
4. "Man In The Long Black Coat"
5. "The Levee's Gonna Break"
6. "Not Dark Yet"
7. "Rollin' & Tumblin'"
8. "A Hard Rain's A-Gonna Fall"
9. "Highway 61 Revisited"
10. "Forgetful Heart"
11. "Thunder On The Mountain"
12. "Ballad Of A Thin Man"
13. "All Along The Watchtower"
14. "Like A Rolling Stone"

Herning, Denmark

1. "Leopard Skin Pillbox Hat"
2. "It Ain't Me Babe"
3. "Things Have Changed"
4. "Mississippi"
5. "The Levee's Gonna Break"
6. "Desolation Row"
7. "High Water (For Charley Patton)"
8. "Simple Twist Of Fate"
9. "Highway 61 Revisited"
10. "Forgetful Heart"
11. "Thunder On The Mountain"
12. "Ballad Of A Thin Man"
13. "All Along The Watchtower"
14. "Like A Rolling Stone"

Malmö, Sweden

1. "Leopard Skin Pillbox Hat"
2. "Girl From The North Country"
3. "Things Have Changed"
4. "Tangled Up In Blue"
5. "Honest With Me"
6. "A Hard Rain's A-Gonna Fall"
7. "High Water (For Charley Patton)"
8. "Blind Willie McTell"
9. "Highway 61 Revisited"
10. "Love Sick"
11. "Thunder On The Mountain"
12. "Ballad Of A Thin Man"
13. "All Along The Watchtower"
14. "Like A Rolling Stone"
  Encore
15. "Blowin' In The Wind"

Stockholm, Sweden

1. "Leopard Skin Pillbox Hat"
2. "To Ramona"
3. "Things Have Changed"
4. "Tangled Up In Blue"
5. "Honest With Me"
6. "Make You Feel My Love"
7. "Summer Days"
8. "Desolation Row"
9. "Highway 61 Revisited"
10. "Forgetful Heart"
11. "Thunder On The Mountain"
12. "Ballad Of A Thin Man"
13. "All Along The Watchtower"
14. "Like A Rolling Stone"
  Encore
15. "Blowin' In The Wind"

Hanover, Germany

1. "Leopard Skin Pillbox Hat"
2. "Don't Think Twice, It's Alright"
3. "Things Have Changed"
4. "Tangled Up In Blue"
5. "Honest With Me"
6. "Not Dark Yet"
7. "Jolene"
8. "Visions Of Johanna"
9. "Highway 61 Revisited"
10. "Sugar Baby"
11. "Thunder On The Mountain"
12. "Ballad Of A Thin Man"
13. "All Along The Watchtower"
14. "Like A Rolling Stone"
  Encore
15. "Blowin' In The Wind"

Nürnberg, Germany

1. "Leopard Skin Pillbox Hat"
2. "It's All Over Now, Baby Blue"
3. "Things Have Changed"
4. "Mississippi"
5. "Honest With Me"
6. "Tangled Up In Blue"
7. "The Levee's Gonna Break"
8. "Desolation Row"
9. "Highway 61 Revisited"
10. "Man In The Long Black Coat"
11. "Thunder On The Mountain"
12. "Ballad Of A Thin Man"
13. "All Along The Watchtower"
14. "Like A Rolling Stone"

Innsbruck, Austria

1. "Leopard Skin Pillbox Hat"
2. "Shooting Star"
3. "Things Have Changed"
4. "Mississippi"
5. "Honest With Me"
6. "Tangled Up In Blue"
7. "Summer Days"
8. "John Brown"
9. "Highway 61 Revisited"
10. "Visions Of Johanna"
11. "Thunder On The Mountain"
12. "Ballad Of A Thin Man"
13. "All Along The Watchtower"
14. "Like A Rolling Stone"
  Encore
15. "Blowin' In The Wind"

Padova, Italy

1. "Leopard Skin Pillbox Hat"
2. "It Ain't Me Babe"
3. "Things Have Changed"
4. "Mississippi"
5. "Honest With Me"
6. "Tangled Up In Blue"
7. "The Levee's Gonna Break"
8. "Desolation Row"
9. "Highway 61 Revisited"
10. "Man In The Long Black Coat"
11. "Thunder On The Mountain"
12. "Ballad Of A Thin Man"
13. "All Along The Watchtower"
14. "Like A Rolling Stone"

Florence, Italy

1. "Leopard Skin Pillbox Hat"
2. "Girl From The North Country"
3. "Things Have Changed"
4. "Spirit On The Water"
5. "Honest With Me"
6. "Tangled Up In Blue"
7. "The Levee's Gonna Break"
8. "Desolation Row"
9. "Highway 61 Revisited"
10. "Forgetful Heart"
11. "Thunder On The Mountain"
12. "Ballad Of A Thin Man"
13. "All Along The Watchtower"
14. "Like A Rolling Stone"

Rome, Italy

1. "Leopard Skin Pillbox Hat"
2. "Don't Think Twice, It's Alright"
3. "Things Have Changed"
4. "Spirit On The Water"
5. "Honest With Me"
6. "The Lonesome Death Of Hattie Carroll"
7. "Ballad Of Hollis Brown"
8. "Desolation Row"
9. "Highway 61 Revisited"
10. "Forgetful Heart"
11. "Thunder On The Mountain"
12. "Ballad Of A Thin Man"
13. "All Along The Watchtower"
14. "Like A Rolling Stone"
  Encore
15. "Blowin' In The Wind"

Assago, Italy

1. "Leopard Skin Pillbox Hat"
2. "It's All Over Now, Baby Blue"
3. "Things Have Changed"
4. "Spirit On The Water"
5. "Honest With Me"
6. "Tangled Up In Blue"
7. "The Levee's Gonna Break"
8. "Desolation Row"
9. "Highway 61 Revisited"
10. "Simple Twist Of Fate"
11. "Thunder On The Mountain"
12. "Ballad Of A Thin Man"
13. "All Along The Watchtower"
14. "Like A Rolling Stone"

Geneva, Switzerland

1. "Leopard Skin Pillbox Hat"
2. "Don't Think Twice, It's Alright"
3. "Things Have Changed"
4. "Mississippi"
5. "Honest With Me"
6. "Tangled Up In Blue"
7. "Summer Days"
8. "John Brown"
9. "Highway 61 Revisited"
10. "Visions Of Johanna"
11. "Thunder On The Mountain"
12. "Ballad Of A Thin Man"
13. "All Along The Watchtower"
14. "Like A Rolling Stone"
15. "Blowin' In The Wind"

Zurich, Switzerland

1. "Leopard Skin Pillbox Hat"
2. "It Ain't Me Babe"
3. "Things Have Changed"
4. "Mississippi"
5. "Honest With Me"
6. "Not Dark Yet"
7. "Jolene"
8. "Man In The Long Black Coat"
9. "Highway 61 Revisited"
10. "A Hard Rain's A-Gonna Fall"
11. "Thunder On The Mountain"
12. "Ballad Of A Thin Man"
13. "All Along The Watchtower"
14. "Like A Rolling Stone"
15. "Blowin' In The Wind"

London, England (First Night)

1. "Leopard Skin Pillbox Hat"
2. "Don't Think Twice, It's Alright"
3. "Things Have Changed"
4. "Mississippi"
5. "Honest With Me"
6. "The Lonesome Death Of Hattie Carroll"
7. "Ballad Of Hollis Brown"
8. "Make You Feel My Love"
9. "Highway 61 Revisited"
10. "A Hard Rain's A-Gonna Fall"
11. "Thunder On The Mountain"
12. "Ballad Of A Thin Man"
13. "All Along The Watchtower"
14. "Jolene"
15. "Like A Rolling Stone"

London, England (Second Night)

1. "Leopard Skin Pillbox Hat"
2. "It's All Over Now, Baby Blue"
3. "Things Have Changed"
4. "Tryin' To Get To Heaven"
5. "Honest With Me"
6. "Tangled Up In Blue"
7. "Summer Days"
8. "Blind Willie McTell"
9. "Highway 61 Revisited"
10. "Desolation Row"
11. "Thunder On The Mountain"
12. "Ballad Of A Thin Man"
13. "All Along The Watchtower"
14. "Like A Rolling Stone"

London, England (Third Night)

1. "Leopard Skin Pillbox Hat"
2. "It's All Over Now, Baby Blue"
3. "Things Have Changed"
4. "Spirit On The Water"
5. "Honest With Me"
6. "Forgetful Heart"
7. "The Levee's Gonna Break"
8. "Man In The Long Black Coat"
9. "Highway 61 Revisited"
10. "Desolation Row"
11. "Thunder On The Mountain"
12. "Ballad Of A Thin Man"
13. "All Along The Watchtower"
14. "Like A Rolling Stone"
15. "Forever Young"

== Tour dates ==
List of concerts, showing date, city, country, venue, opening acts, attendance, and gross revenue
Date	City	Country	Venue	Opening act	Attendance	Revenue
Asia
April 3, 2011	Taipei	Taiwan	Taipei Arena	—N/a	—N/a	—N/a
April 6, 2011	Beijing	China	Workers Indoor Arena	—N/a	—N/a	—N/a
April 8, 2011	Shanghai	China	Shanghai Grand Stage	—N/a	—N/a	—N/a
April 10, 2011	Ho Chi Minh City	Vietnam	RMIT Sports Grounds	—N/a	—N/a	—N/a
April 12, 2011	Hong Kong		KITEC Star Hall	—N/a	5,087 / 5,836	$562,887
April 13, 2011	Hong Kong		KITEC Star Hall	—N/a	5,087 / 5,836	$562,887
April 15, 2011 (Note: The April 15, 2011, concert in Singapore was part of Timbre Rock & Roots.)	Singapore		Marina Promenade	—N/a	—N/a	—N/a
Oceania
April 17, 2011 (Note: The April 17, 2011, concert in Fremantle was part of West Coast Blues & Roots Festival.)	Fremantle	Australia	Fremantle Park	—N/a	—N/a	—N/a
April 19, 2011	Adelaide	Australia	Adelaide Entertainment Centre	B.B. King	5,249 / 6,282	$770,876
April 20, 2011	Melbourne	Australia	Rod Laver Arena	Paul Kelly	12,566 / 14,662	$1,528,180
April 21, 2011	Melbourne	Australia	Rod Laver Arena	Paul Kelly	12,566 / 14,662	$1,528,180
April 23, 2011	Wollongong	Australia	WIN Entertainment Centre	—N/a	3,214 / 3,890	$531,134
April 25, 2011 (Note: The April 25 and 26, 2011 concerts in Byron Bay were part of Byron Bay Bluesfest.)	Byron Bay	Australia	Tyagarah Park	—N/a	—N/a	—N/a
April 26, 2011	Byron Bay	Australia	Tyagarah Park	—N/a	—N/a	—N/a
April 27, 2011	Sydney	Australia	Sydney Entertainment Centre	Paul Kelly	10,672 / 12,405	$1,615,030
April 28, 2011	Sydney	Australia	Sydney Entertainment Centre	Paul Kelly	10,672 / 12,405	$1,615,030
April 30, 2011	Auckland	New Zealand	Vector Arena	Tim Finn	6,673 / 7,127	$694,302
Europe/Middle East
June 16, 2011 (Note: The June 16, 2011, concert in Cork was part of Live at the Marquee.)	Cork	Ireland	The Docklands	—N/a	—N/a	—N/a
June 18, 2011 (Note: The June 18, 2011, concert in London was part of London Fies.)	London	England	Finsbury Park	—N/a	—N/a	—N/a
June 20, 2011	Tel Aviv	Israel	Ramat Gan Stadium	Rickie Lee Jones	—N/a	—N/a
June 22, 2011	Milan	Italy	Alcatraz	—N/a	—N/a	—N/a
June 24, 2011 (Note: The June 24, 2011, concert in Sursee was part of Sursee Summer Sound.)	Sursee	Switzerland	Zirkusplatz	—N/a	—N/a	—N/a
June 25, 2011	Mainz	Germany	Volkspark	—N/a	—N/a	—N/a
June 26, 2011	Hamburg	Germany	Hamburg Stadtpark	—N/a	—N/a	—N/a
June 27, 2011	Odense	Denmark	The Funen Village	—N/a	—N/a	—N/a
June 29, 2011 (Note: The June 29, 2011, concert in Bergen was part of Bergen Calling.)	Bergen	Norway	Koengen	—N/a	—N/a	—N/a
June 30, 2011	Oslo	Norway	Oslo Spektrum	—N/a	—N/a	—N/a
July 2, 2011 (Note: The July 2, 2011, concert in Borlänge was part of Peace & Love.)	Borlänge	Sweden	Borganäsvägen	—N/a	—N/a	—N/a
North America
July 14, 2011	Santa Barbara	United States	Santa Barbara Bowl	—N/a	3,769 / 4,059	$308,844
July 15, 2011 (Note: The July 15, 2011, concert in Costa Mesa was part of the Orange County Fair.)	Costa Mesa	United States	Pacific Amphitheatre	—N/a	—N/a	—N/a
July 16, 2011	Las Vegas	United States	Pearl Concert Theater	—N/a	—N/a	—N/a
July 18, 2011	Phoenix	United States	Comerica Theatre	—N/a	—N/a	—N/a
July 19, 2011	Tucson	United States	Anselmo Valencia Tori Amphitheater	—N/a	—N/a	—N/a
July 21, 2011	Albuquerque	United States	Hard Rock Pavilion	—N/a	—N/a	—N/a
July 23, 2011	Thackerville	United States	WinStar World Casino	—N/a	—N/a	—N/a
July 24, 2011	New Braunfels	United States	Whitewater Amphitheater	Leon Russell	—N/a	—N/a
July 26, 2011	New Orleans	United States	Lakefront Arena	Leon Russell	3,390 / 4,000	$175,546
July 27, 2011	Pensacola	United States	Pensacola Civic Center	Leon Russell	—N/a	—N/a
July 28, 2011	Atlanta	United States	Delta Classic Chastain Park Amphitheater	Leon Russell	—N/a	—N/a
July 30, 2011	Memphis	United States	Mud Island Amphitheater	Leon Russell	4,147 / 4,700	$213,163
August 1, 2011	Nashville	United States	Ryman Auditorium	Leon Russell	—N/a	—N/a
August 2, 2011	Evansville	United States	Roberts Municipal Stadium	Leon Russell	—N/a	—N/a
August 3, 2011	Toledo	United States	Toledo Zoo Amphitheater	Leon Russell	—N/a	—N/a
August 5, 2011	Kettering	United States	Fraze Pavilion	The Carolina Chocolate Drops	3,828 / 4,307	$175,841
August 6, 2011	Cleveland	United States	Nautica Pavilion	Leon Russell	—N/a	—N/a
August 7, 2011 (Note: The August 7, 2011, concert in Costa Mesa was part of the Meadow Brook Music Festival.)	Rochester Hills	United States	Meadow Brook Hall	Leon Russell	3,976 / 7,701	$182,429
August 9, 2011	Hopewell	United States	Constellation Brands Performing Arts Center	Leon Russell	—N/a	—N/a
August 10, 2011	Scranton	United States	Toyota Pavilion	Leon Russell	—N/a	—N/a
August 12, 2011	Bethel	United States	Bethel Woods Center for the Arts	Leon Russell	—N/a	—N/a
August 13, 2011	Wantagh	United States	Nikon at Jones Beach Theater	Leon Russell	—N/a	—N/a
August 14, 2011	Asbury Park	United States	Asbury Park Convention Hall	Leon Russell	—N/a	—N/a
August 16, 2011	Columbia	United States	Merriweather Post Pavilion	Leon Russell	—N/a	—N/a
August 17, 2011	Philadelphia	United States	Mann Center for the Performing Arts	Leon Russell	5,910 / 6,421	$318,285
August 19, 2011	Gilford	United States	Meadowbrook U.S. Cellular Pavilion	Leon Russell	3,385 / 5,795	$173,806
August 20, 2011	Bangor	United States	Bangor Waterfront Pavilion	Leon Russell	—N/a	—N/a
August 21, 2011	Boston	United States	House of Blues	—N/a	—N/a	—N/a
Europe
October 6, 2011	Dublin	Ireland	The O_{2}	Mark Knopfler	—N/a	—N/a
October 8, 2011	Glasgow	Scotland	Braehead Arena	Mark Knopfler	—N/a	—N/a
October 9, 2011	Glasgow	Scotland	Braehead Arena	Mark Knopfler	—N/a	—N/a
October 10, 2011	Manchester	England	Manchester Evening News Arena	Mark Knopfler	9,242 / 10,669	$906,544
October 11, 2011	Nottingham	England	Capital FM Arena	Mark Knopfler	—N/a	—N/a
October 13, 2011	Cardiff	Wales	Cardiff International Arena	Mark Knopfler	—N/a	—N/a
October 14, 2011	Bournemouth	England	Bournemouth International Centre	Mark Knopfler	—N/a	—N/a
October 16, 2011	Lille	France	Zénith de Lille	Mark Knopfler	—N/a	—N/a
October 17, 2011	Paris	France	Palais Omnisports de Paris-Bercy	Mark Knopfler	—N/a	—N/a
October 19, 2011	Antwerp	Belgium	Sportpaleis	Mark Knopfler	13,988 / 14,160	$1,217,740
October 20, 2011	Rotterdam	Netherlands	Rotterdam Ahoy	Mark Knopfler	—N/a	—N/a
October 21, 2011	Esch-sur-Alzette	Luxembourg	Rockhal	Mark Knopfler	—N/a	—N/a
October 23, 2011	Oberhausen	Germany	König Pilsener Arena	Mark Knopfler	—N/a	—N/a
October 25, 2011	Mannheim	Germany	SAP Arena	Mark Knopfler	—N/a	—N/a
October 26, 2011	Munich	Germany	Olympiahalle	Mark Knopfler	—N/a	—N/a
October 27, 2011	Leipzig	Germany	Arena Leipzig	Mark Knopfler	—N/a	—N/a
October 29, 2011	Berlin	Germany	O_{2} World Berlin	Mark Knopfler	12,257 / 12,417	$1,161,540
October 31, 2011	Hamburg	Germany	O_{2} World Hamburg	Mark Knopfler	9,184 / 11,159	$893,036
November 2, 2011	Herning	Denmark	Jyske Bank Boxen	Mark Knopfler	—N/a	—N/a
November 3, 2011	Malmö	Sweden	Malmö Arena	Mark Knopfler	—N/a	—N/a
November 4, 2011	Stockholm	Sweden	Ericsson Globe	Mark Knopfler	—N/a	—N/a
November 6, 2011	Hanover	Germany	TUI Arena	Mark Knopfler	—N/a	—N/a
November 7, 2011	Nuremberg	Germany	Arena Nürnberger Versicherung	Mark Knopfler	—N/a	—N/a
November 8, 2011	Innsbruck	Austria	Olympiahalle	Mark Knopfler	—N/a	—N/a
November 9, 2011	Padua	Italy	PalaFabris	Mark Knopfler	—N/a	—N/a
November 11, 2011	Florence	Italy	Nelson Mandela Forum	Mark Knopfler	—N/a	—N/a
November 12, 2011	Rome	Italy	PalaLottomatica	Mark Knopfler	—N/a	—N/a
November 14, 2011	Milan	Italy	Mediolanum Forum	Mark Knopfler	—N/a	—N/a
November 15, 2011	Geneva	Switzerland	SEG Geneva Arena	Mark Knopfler	—N/a	—N/a
November 16, 2011	Zürich	Switzerland	Hallenstadion	Mark Knopfler	—N/a	—N/a
November 19, 2011	London	England	HMV Hammersmith Apollo	Mark Knopfler	—N/a	—N/a
November 20, 2011	London	England	HMV Hammersmith Apollo	Mark Knopfler	—N/a	—N/a
November 21, 2011	London	England	HMV Hammersmith Apollo	Mark Knopfler	—N/a	—N/a

== Band ==
- Bob Dylan – vocals, harmonica, organ, guitar
- Tony Garnier – bass
- Donnie Herron – violin, electric mandolin, pedal steel, lap steel
- Stu Kimball – guitar
- George Recelli – drums
- Charlie Sexton – guitar
