= Beacon World Tour =

2012–13 concert tour by Two Door Cinema Club

- Tour by Two Door Cinema Club
- Associated album: Beacon
- Start date: 4 September 2012
- End date: 13 December 2013
- Legs: 17
- No. of shows: 177

Two Door Cinema Club concert chronology
- Tourist History World Tour (2010–11); Beacon World Tour (2012); -

The Beacon World Tour was a world tour by Northern Ireland indie rock band Two Door Cinema Club.

== Background ==
The tour was announced in April 2012 with a date in Paris announced followed by a German tour all of which will take place in November of that year. A show in New York was announced in June, followed by more shows in France. A twenty-one date North American tour was announced for September 2012 and would begin in New York City and end in Santa Ana on October 28. A short intimate tour of the UK and Ireland was announced to showcase the band's new album with the shows taking place in Birmingham, Manchester, London and Dublin in early September thus kicking off the Beacon World Tour. Three festival shows were also announced for Australia, which took place at the end of December and early January 2013. A full UK tour took place in January and February 2013 with dates across the whole of the United Kingdom, the band would also perform their biggest Irish headline show ever in January when they will perform at Dublin's O2. This was set to be Two Door Cinema Club's biggest tour to date. They also performed their biggest show to date at Amsterdam's Heineken Music Hall in March 2013.

== Support Act ==
- Guards (Leg 2; North America—select dates)
- St. Lucia (Leg 2; North America—select dates)
- Bad Veins (Leg 2 & 15; North America;select dates)
- Friends (Leg 2; North America)
- The Cast of Cheers (Leg 3; Europe—select dates & The O2, Dublin)
- Alt-J (Leg 3; Europe—select dates)
- Kowalski (Leg 3; Europe—select dates)
- The Vaccines (Leg 5; Australia)
- The Jungle Giants (Leg 5; Australia)
- Bastille (Leg 8; United Kingdom—select dates)
- Swim Deep (Leg 8; United Kingdom—select dates)
- Richie Egan (Leg 8; Dublin)
- Chvrches (Leg 10; United Kingdom)
- Everything Everything (Leg 10; London only)
- St. Lucia (Leg 15; North America)
- Capital Cities (Greek Theatre, Los Angeles)
- Peace (Leg 15; North America—select dates)
- Swim Deep (Leg 17; London O2 Arena & Blackpool)
- Crystal Fighters (Leg 17; London O2 Arena)
- Circa Waves (Leg 17; Blackpool)

== Tour dates ==
Date	City	Country	Venue
Europe
September 4, 2012	Birmingham	England	HMV Library
September 5, 2012	Manchester	England	Sound Control
September 6, 2012	London	England	O_{2} Shepherd's Bush Empire
September 7, 2012	Dublin	Ireland	The Academy
September 8, 2012^{[A]}	Isle of Wight	England	Robin Hill
September 19, 2012^{[B]}	Ibiza	Spain	Ibiza Rocks Hotel
North America
September 27, 2012	New York City	United States	Music Hall of Williamsburg
September 28, 2012	New York City	United States	Rumsey Playfield
September 29, 2012	Philadelphia	United States	Electric Factory
September 30, 2012	Boston	United States	House of Blues
October 2, 2012	Washington, D.C.	United States	9:30 Club
October 3, 2012	Washington, D.C.	United States	9:30 Club
October 5, 2012	Toronto	Canada	Sound Academy
October 6, 2012	Montreal	Canada	Métropolis
October 8, 2012	Columbus	United States	Newport Music Hall
October 9, 2012	Chicago	United States	Riviera Theatre
October 10, 2012	Minneapolis	United States	First Avenue
October 11, 2012	Kansas City	United States	Beaumont Club
October 13, 2012	Houston	United States	House of Blues
October 14, 2012^{[C]}	Austin	United States	Zilker Park
October 16, 2012	Denver	United States	Ogden Theatre
October 18, 2012	Vancouver	Canada	Commodore Ballroom
October 19, 2012	Vancouver	Canada	Vogue Theatre
October 20, 2012^{[D]}	Seattle	United States	Showbox SoDo
October 21, 2012	Portland	United States	Crystal Ballroom
October 23, 2012	Oakland	United States	Fox Oakland Theatre
October 25, 2012	Los Angeles	United States	Hollywood Palladium
October 26, 2012	San Diego	United States	Soma
October 27, 2012	Las Vegas	United States	House of Blues
October 28, 2012	Santa Ana	United States	The Observatory
Europe
November 9, 2012	Rouen	France	Le 106
November 10, 2012^{[E]}	Lorient	France	Cosmao Dumanoir
November 12, 2012	Nîmes	France	La Paloma
November 13, 2012	Bordeaux	France	Le Rocher de Palmer
November 14, 2012	Nantes	France	Stereolux
November 15, 2012	Paris	France	Zénith de Paris
November 17, 2012	Amsterdam	Netherlands	Paradiso
November 19, 2012	Cologne	Germany	E-Werk
November 20, 2012	Munich	Germany	Tonhalle
November 21, 2012	Offenbach am Main	Germany	Capitol
November 23, 2012	Berlin	Germany	Astra
November 24, 2012	Hamburg	Germany	Große Freiheit 36
November 26, 2012	Brussels	Belgium	Orangerie
North America
December 5, 2012	Santa Cruz	United States	The Catalyst
December 6, 2012	Sacramento	United States	Ace of Spades
December 7, 2012^{[F]}	Oakland	United States	Oracle Arena
December 8, 2012^{[L]}	Los Angeles	United States	Gibson Amphitheatre
Asia
December 12, 2012	Osaka	Japan	Osaka Hatch
December 14, 2012	Yokohama	Japan	Bay Hall
December 15, 2012	Tokyo	Japan	Studio Coast
Oceania
December 29, 2012	Melbourne	Australia	Festival Hall
December 30, 2012^{[G]}	Marion Bay	Australia	Festival Grounds
December 31, 2012^{[G]}	Lorne	Australia	Festival Grounds
January 1, 2013^{[H]}	Sydney	Australia	The Domain
January 3, 2013	Sydney	Australia	Hordern Pavilion
January 5, 2013^{[I]}	Busselton	Australia	Sir Stewart Bovell Park
January 7, 2013	Brisbane	Australia	The Tivoli
January 8, 2013	Brisbane	Australia	The Tivoli
Asia
January 11, 2012	Marina Bay	Singapore	Esplanade Concert Hall
Europe
January 18, 2013	Belfast	Northern Ireland	The Limelight
January 19, 2013	Dublin	Ireland	The O2
January 24, 2013	Newcastle	England	O2 Academy Newcastle
January 25, 2013	Manchester	England	Manchester Apollo
January 26, 2013	Manchester	England	Manchester Apollo
January 28, 2013	Southampton	England	Southampton Guildhall
January 29, 2013	Nottingham	England	Rock City
January 31, 2013	Cardiff	Wales	Cardiff University
February 1, 2013	Birmingham	England	O2 Academy Birmingham
February 2, 2013	Birmingham	England	O2 Academy Birmingham
February 4, 2013	Aberdeen	Scotland	Music Hall
February 5, 2013	Glasgow	Scotland	Barrowlands
February 7, 2013	Leeds	England	O2 Academy Leeds
February 8, 2013	London	England	Brixton Academy
February 21, 2013	Zürich	Switzerland	X-Tra
February 22, 2013	Milan	Italy	Maggazini Generali
February 23, 2013	Rome	Italy	Orion Club
February 25, 2013	Vienna	Austria	Gasometer
February 26, 2013	Prague	Czech Republic	Lucerna Music Bar
February 28, 2013	Esch-sur-Alzette	Luxembourg	Rockhal
March 1, 2013	Amsterdam	Netherlands	Heineken Music Hall
March 3, 2013	Cologne	Germany	E-Werk
March 4, 2013	Münster	Germany	Skaters Palace
March 5, 2012	Hamburg	Germany	Docks
March 7, 2013	Berlin	Germany	Astra
March 8, 2013	Stuttgart	Germany	Longhorn
March 9, 2013	Bremen	Germany	Modernes
March 11, 2013	Toulouse	France	Bikini
March 12, 2013	Rennes	France	Liberte
March 14, 2013	Brussels	Belgium	Ancienne Belgique
South America
March 29, 2013	Rio de Janeiro	Brazil	Circo Voador
March 30, 2013^{[W]}	São Paulo	Brazil	Jockey Club
April 3, 2013^{[X]}	Buenos Aires	Argentina	Estadio Costanera
April 4, 2013	Buenos Aires	Argentina	La Trastienda Club
April 5, 2013^{[Y]}	Bogotá	Colombia	Parque Zona
April 6, 2013^{[Z]}	Santiago	Chile	Parque O'Higgins
North America
April 9, 2013	Austin	United States	Stubb's Waller Creek Amphitheatre
April 10, 2013	Austin	United States	Stubb's Waller Creek Amphitheatre
April 11, 2013	Dallas	United States	Palladium Ballroom
April 13, 2013^{[N]}	Indio	United States	Empire Polo Club
April 16, 2013	Monterrey	Mexico	Auditorio Banamex
April 17, 2013	Mexico City	Mexico	Blackberry Auditorium
April 18, 2013	Mexico City	Mexico	Vive Cuervo Salon
April 20, 2013^{[N]}	Indio	United States	Empire Polo Club
Europe
April 25, 2013	Edinburgh	Scotland	Edinburgh Corn Exchange
April 26, 2013	Wolverhampton	England	Wolverhampton Civic Hall
April 27, 2013	London	England	Alexandra Palace
May 4, 2013	Oslo	Norway	Rockefeller Music Hall
May 6, 2013	Copenhagen	Denmark	Amager Bio
May 7, 2013	Stockholm	Sweden	Debaser Medis
May 9, 2013	Helsinki	Finland	The Circus
May 18, 2013^{[S]}	Saint-Laurent-de-Cuves	France	Festival Grounds
May 25, 2013^{[AH]}	Derry	Northern Ireland	Ebrington Square
May 29, 2013	Saint Petersburg	Russia	Cosmonavt
May 30, 2013	Moscow	Russia	Stadium Live
June 1, 2013	Yekaterinburg	Russia	Tele-Club
June 13, 2013^{[AA]}	Hultsfred	Sweden	Hulingen Lake
June 14, 2013^{[M]}	Barcelona	Spain	Fira Gran Via
June 20, 2013	Lille	France	L'Aéronef
June 27, 2013^{[AI]}	London	England	The Lexington
June 29, 2013^{[AC]}	Pilton	England	Worthy Farm
June 30, 2013^{[O]}	Marmande	France	Plaine de la Filhole
July 5, 2013^{[P]}	Werchter	Belgium	Werchter Festival Grounds
July 6, 2013^{[R]}	Belfort	France	Lac de Malsaucy
July 9, 2013^{[AD]}	Paris	France	Cité de la Musique
July 11, 2013^{[AJ]}	Bilbao	Spain	Kobetamendi Park
July 12, 2013^{[J]}	Oeiras	Portugal	Algés Riverside
July 13, 2013^{[AB]}	Dublin	Ireland	Phoenix Park
July 19, 2013^{[AF]}	Carhaix	France	La Prairie de Kerampuilh
July 20, 2013^{[AK]}	Biarritz	France	Parc des Sports Aguiléra
July 21, 2013^{[AG]}	Salacgrīva	Latvia	Zvejnieku Parks
July 26, 2013^{[K]}	Benidorm	Spain	L'Aigüera Park
North America
August 2, 2013^{[U]}	Montreal	Canada	Parc Jean-Drapeau
August 3, 2013	Chicago	United States	House of Blues
August 4, 2013^{[AE]}	Chicago	United States	Grant Park
Asia
August 10, 2013^{[Q]}	Tokyo	Japan	Festival Grounds
August 11, 2013^{[Q]}	Osaka	Japan	Festival Grounds
August 14, 2013^{[AL]}	Seoul	South Korea	Olympic Stadium
Europe
August 17, 2013^{[T]}	Chelmsford	England	Hylands Park
August 18, 2013^{[T]}	Staffordshire	England	Weston Park
August 24, 2013^{[V]}	Charleville-Mézières	France	Square Bayard
August 29, 2013^{[AM]}	Zurich	Switzerland	Festival Grounds
August 31, 2013^{[AP]}	Stradbally	Ireland	Stradbally Hall
North America
October 2, 2013	Philadelphia	United States	Tower Theater
October 4, 2013	Washington, D.C.	United States	DAR Constitution Hall
October 5, 2013	Boston	United States	Royale
October 6, 2013	Boston	United States	Royale
October 9, 2013	Sayreville	United States	Starland Ballroom
October 10, 2013	New York City	United States	Hammerstein Ballroom
October 11, 2013	New York City	United States	Hammerstein Ballroom
October 12, 2013	Rochester	United States	Water Street Music Hall
October 14, 2014	Toronto	Canada	Mod Club Theatre
October 15, 2013	Toronto	Canada	The Music Hall
October 16, 2013	Cleveland	United States	House of Blues
October 18, 2013	Pontiac	United States	The Crofoot
October 19, 2013	Chicago	United States	Riviera Theatre
October 21, 2013	Denver	United States	Ogden Theatre
October 23, 2013	Calgary	Canada	MacEwan Hall
October 25, 2013	Vancouver	Canada	Orpheum
October 26, 2013	Seattle	United States	Neptune Theater
October 29, 2013	Oakland	United States	Fox Oakland Theatre
October 31, 2013	San Diego	United States	Humphrey's
November 1, 2014	Pomona	United States	Pomona Fox Theater
November 2, 2013	Los Angeles	United States	Greek Theatre
November 5, 2013	Houston	United States	Bayou Music Center
November 6, 2013	New Orleans	United States	House of Blues
November 8, 2013	St. Augustine	United States	St. Augustine Amphitheatre
November 9, 2013	Tampa^{[AN]}	United States	MidFlorida Credit Union Amphitheatre
November 10, 2013^{[AN]}	West Palm Beach	United States	Cruzan Amphitheatre
November 11, 2013	Atlanta	United States	Buckhead Theatre
November 12, 2013	Nashville	United States	Marathon Music Works
Asia
November 24, 2013^{[AO]}	Kuala Lumpur	Malaysia	Padang Astaka
November 26, 2013	Manila	Philippines	NBC Tent
November 28, 2013	Bangkok	Thailand	Bitec Banga
November 29, 2013^{[AQ]}	West Kowloon	Hong Kong	Cyberport
December 1, 2013	Taipei	Taiwan	ATT Show Box
Europe
December 12, 2013	Blackpool	England	Empress Ballroom
December 13, 2013	London	England	The O2 Arena

Festivals and other miscellaneous performances

^{A} This show was part of Bestival.
^{B} This show was part of Ibiza Rocks.
^{C} This show was part of the Austin City Limits Music Festival.
^{D} This show was part of the Heineken City Arts Festival.
^{E} This show was part of the Festival Les Indisciplines.
^{F} This show was part of Live 105's Not So Silent Night.
^{G} These shows were part of the Falls Festival.
^{H} This show was part of Field Day Sydney.
^{I} This show was part of the Southbound Festival.
^{J} This show was part of Optimus Alive!.
^{K} This show was part of the Low Cost Festival.
^{L} This show was part of KROQ Almost Acoustic Christmas.
^{M} This show was part of the Sónar Festival.
^{N} These shows were part of the Coachella Valley Music and Arts Festival.
^{O} This show was part of the Festival Garorock.
^{P} This show was part of Rock Werchter.
^{Q} These shows were part of the Summer Sonic Festival.
^{R} This show was part of the Eurockéennes Festival.
^{S} This show was part of the Papillons de Nuit Festival.
^{T} These shows are part of V Festival.
^{U} This show was part of the Osheaga Festival.

^{V} This show is part of the Le Cabaret Vert Festival.
^{W} This show was part of Lollapalooza Brazil.
^{X} This show was part of El Festival Mas Grande.
^{Y} THis show was part of the Zona Festival.
^{Z} This show was part of Lollapalooza Chile.
^{AA} This show was part of the Hultsfred Festival.
^{AB} TDCC supported The Killers on this date.
^{AC} This show was part of the Glastonbury Festival 2013.
^{AD} This show was part of The Days Off Festival.
^{AE} This show was part of Lollapalooza.
^{AF} This show was part of The Vieilles Charrues Festival.
^{AG} This show was part of the Positivus Festival.
^{AH} This show was part of Radio 1's Big Weekend.
^{AI} This show was part of the XFM Warcild Concert.
^{AJ} This show was part of Bilbao BBK Live.
^{AK} This show is part of the Big Festival.
^{AL} This show was part of SuperSonic.
^{AM} This show is part of Zurich Openair.
^{AN} These shows are part of the Coastline Festival.
^{AO} This show is part of the Urbanscapes Festival.
^{AP} This show is part of The Electric Picnic Festival.
^{AQ} This show is part of the Clockenflap Festival.

=== Box office score data ===
Venue	City	Tickets sold / available	Gross revenue
9:30 Club	Washington, D.C.	2,400 / 2,400 (100%)	$67,200
Metropolis	Montreal	1,425 / 1,750 (81%)	$40,221
E-Werk	Cologne	2,000 / 2,000 (100%)	$56,057
Tonhalle	Munich	2,000 / 2,000 (100%)	$56,199
Capitol	Offenbach am Main	1,531 / 1,700 (90%)	$43,288
Astra	Berlin	1,600 / 1,600 (100%)	$45,264
Grosse Freiheit	Hamburg	1,600 / 1,600 (100%)	$45,447
Hordern Pavilion	Sydney	4,256 / 5,198 (82%)	$280,928
Stubb's Waller Creek Amphitheatre	Austin	4,400 / 4,400 (100%)	$123,220
Palladium Ballroom	Dallas	2,706 / 2,706 (100%)	$80,570
Auditorio Banamex	Monterrey	3,154 / 3,432 (92%)	$103,147
Blackberry Auditorium	Mexico City	6,403 / 6,508 (98%)	$248,535
Riviera Theatre	Chicago	2,500 / 2,500 (100%)	$72,500
Fox Oakland Theatre	Oakland	2,800 / 2,800 (100%)	$91,000
Greek Theatre	Los Angeles	5,867 / 5,867 (100%)	$195,475
The O2 Arena	London	13,667 / 16,825 (81%)	$533,409

== Setlist ==
This setlist changes order most of the time, except for the two first songs.

1. "Next Year"
2. "Undercover Martyn"
3. "Do You Want It All?"
4. "This Is The Life"
5. "Wake Up"
6. "You're Not Stubborn"
7. "Spring"
8. "Sleep Alone"
9. "Sun"
10. "Something Good Can Work"
11. "Beacon" (Live Debut)
12. "Settle"
13. "Handshake"
14. "Eat That Up, It's Good For You"
15. "What You Know"
  Encore
16. "Someday"
17. "Come Back Home"
18. "I Can Talk"
