= Rotterdam Ahoy =

Event arena in the Netherlands

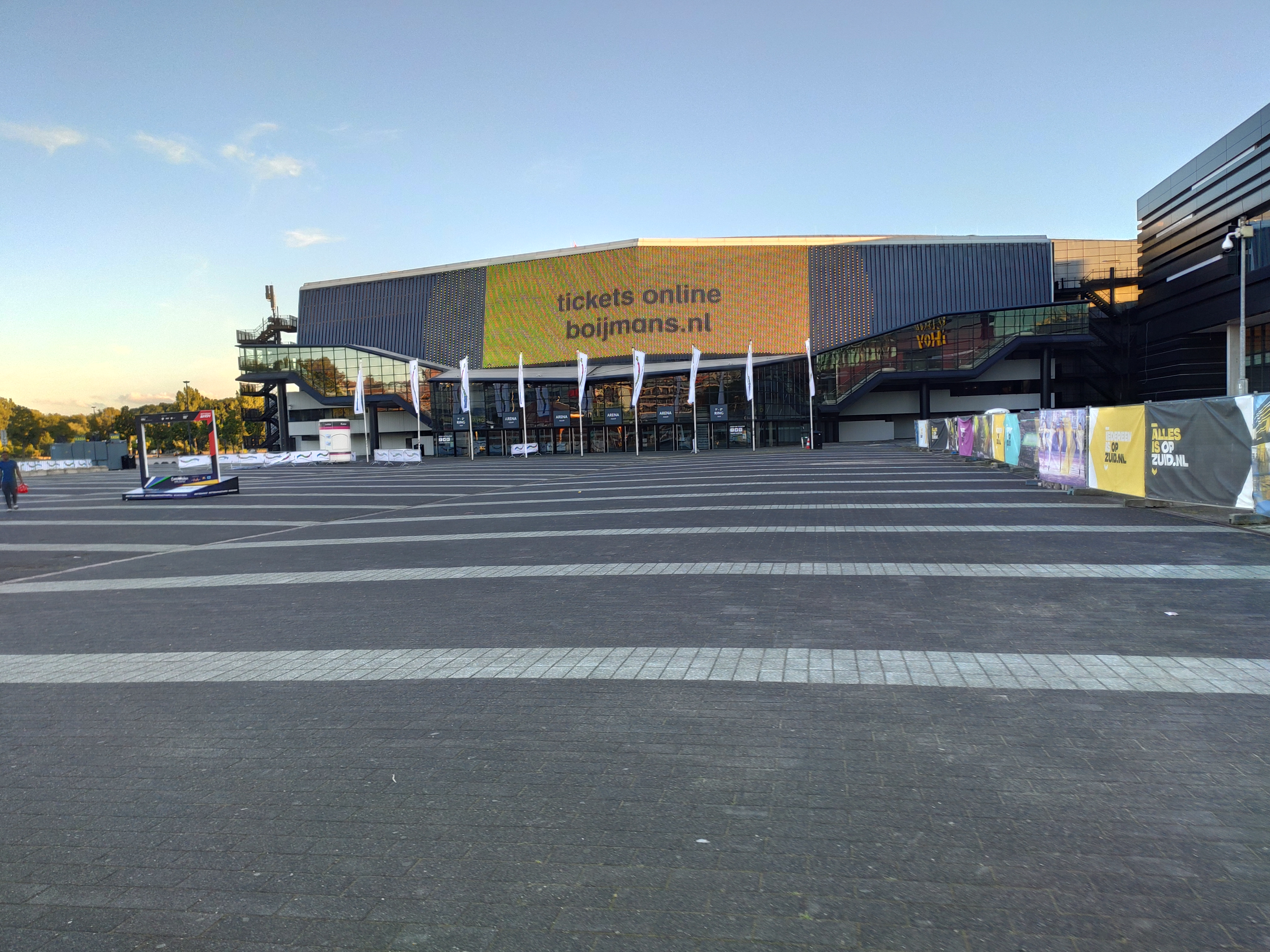
- Ahoy Arena in 2020, the plaza building (right) is now redeveloped as RACC and RTM Stage
- Interactive map of Rotterdam Ahoy
- Former names: Ahoy Rotterdam
- Address: Ahoyweg 10; 3084 BA Rotterdam; Netherlands
- Coordinates: 51°52′58″N 4°29′17″E
- Owner: Ontwikkelingsbedrijf Rotterdam
- Operator: AEG / ASM Global
- Public transit: D E Zuidplein

Construction
- Built: 1968–1970
- Renovated: 1980, 1998, 2011
- Expanded: 1980, 1997, 2020

Website
- ahoy.nl

Rotterdam Ahoy (formerly known as Ahoy Rotterdam or simply as Ahoy) is a multi-purpose complex with a convention centre and an indoor arena located in Rotterdam, Netherlands. Opened originally in 1950, the current complex consists of three main venues: a fairs and events hall, a congress and conference centre, and the main venue the Ahoy Arena. The latter (informally known as the Sportpaleis, lit. 'Sport Palace') opened on 15 January 1971 and is the largest multi-purpose venue in the Netherlands, with a capacity of 16,426 as of May 2019.

== Background and history ==
=== Original exhibition hall ===
The venue has a history dating back to 1950. After the devastation of World War II, the entire city of Rotterdam needed to be rebuilt, as practically nothing was left standing. Five years after the end of the war, the works at the city and their harbor was almost finished. To celebrate the last phase, an exposition called Rotterdam Ahoy! was held. The exhibition was held in a single hall that was built for the occasion and was located where the Erasmus MC is exactly today. The temporary exhibition hall was called Ahoy'-Hal and was used for both national and international events until 1966 when local authorities decided to demolish the hall. The hall was badly damaged during the North Sea flood of 1953, when it was used as shelter for the victims. After 1966, temporary accommodation was found at Hofdijk/Pompenburg in the center of Rotterdam, on the site of an abandoned airstrip.

=== Current Ahoy complex ===
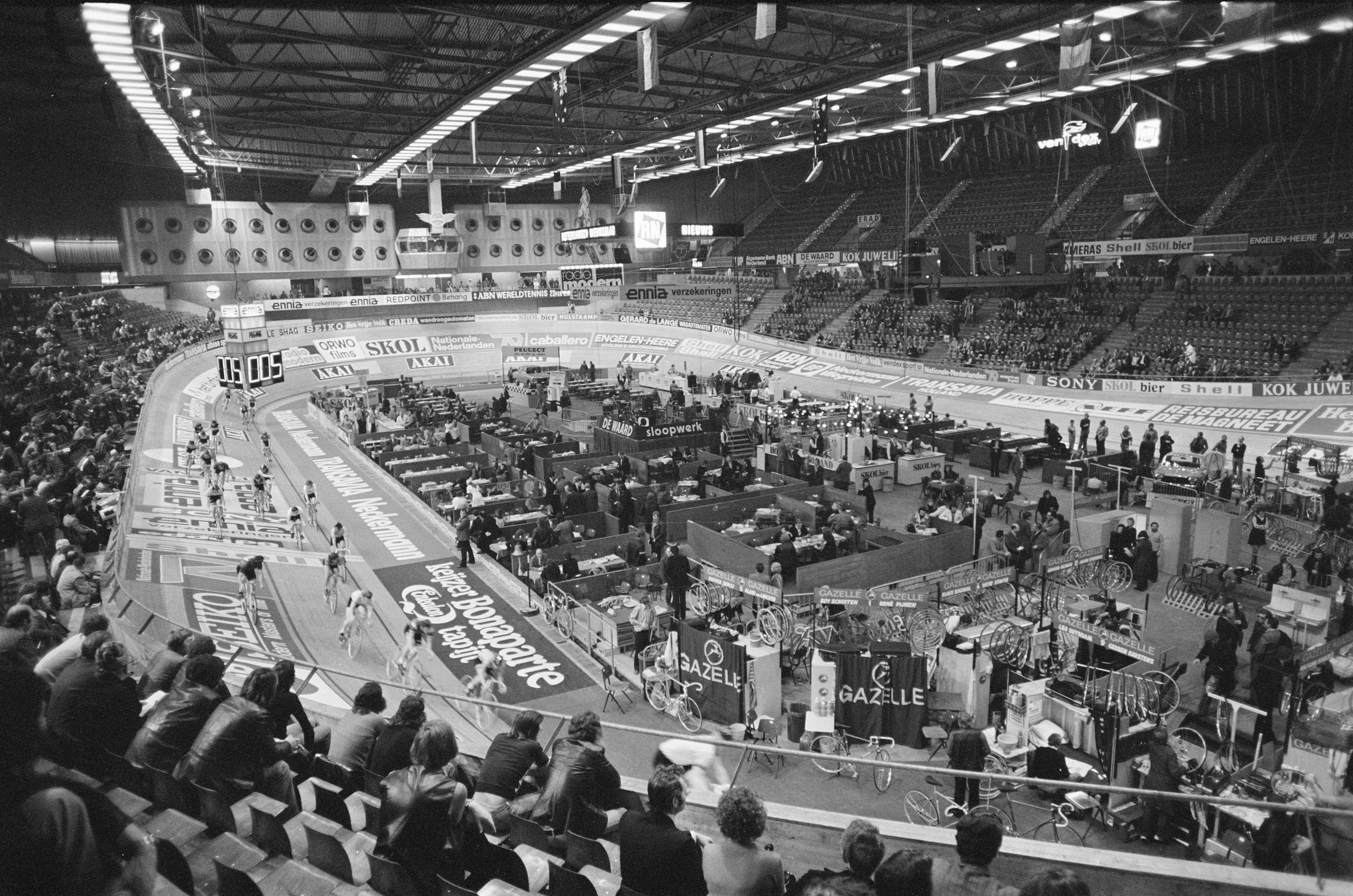
Ahoy Arena (Sportpaleis) during the six-day track cycling race in 1975

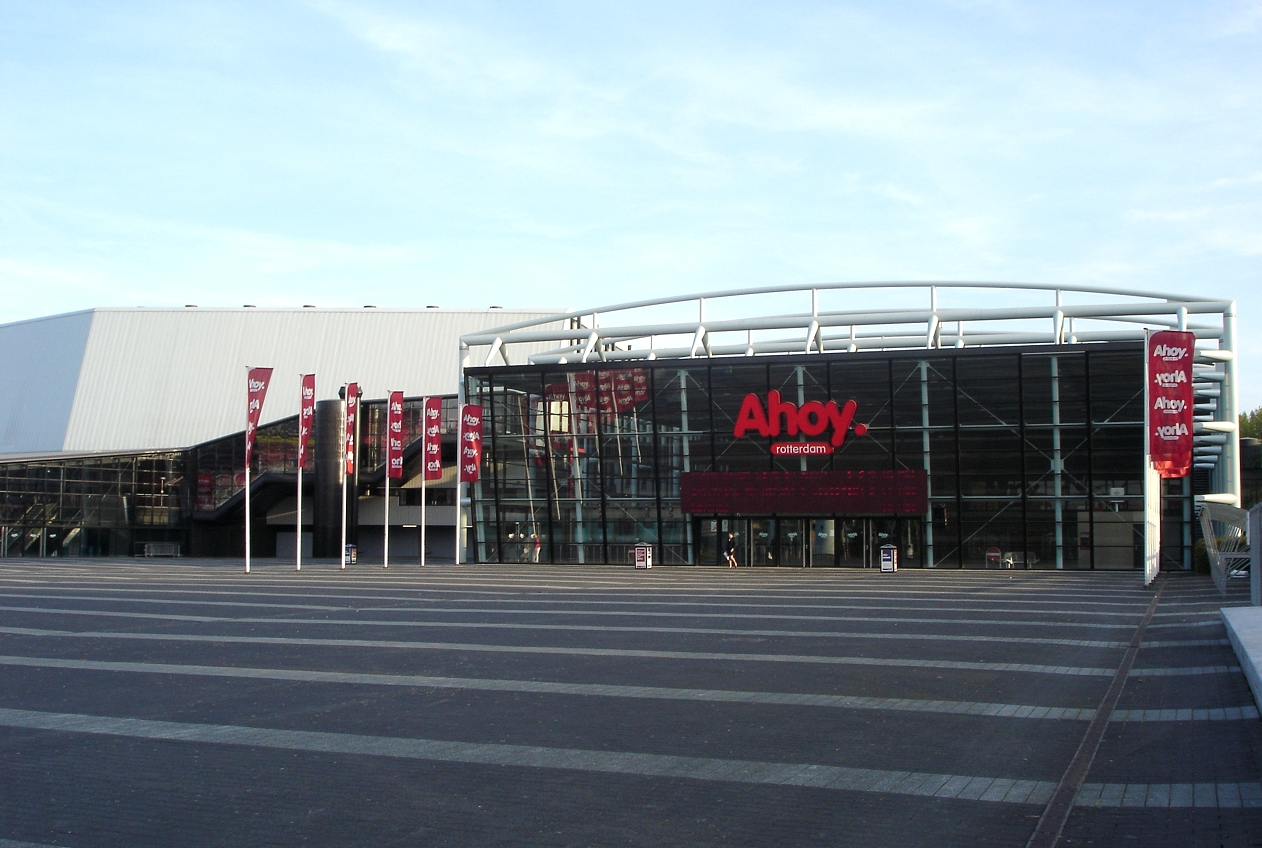
Rotterdam Ahoy in April 2007

The current complex began to take shape in 1968. As the Sportpaleis, originally designed as an indoor velodrome, and its three annexes were completed in 1970. The official opening of the Sportpalais took place during Six Days of Rotterdam, a six-day track cycling race, and was in the presence of the Prince Claus on 15 January 1971. However, in September 1970, the first fair, the Femina Fashion and Household Fair, already took place before the official opening, in the Ahoy Halls. The complex's striking design won various national and international awards. The design of the venue took inspiration from the relation of the Dutch people and the water, with the building laid out like a ship.

Due the high demands, two further halls were added to the complex in 1980. The main arena was converted into a multi-use arena in 1988, when the arena's cycling track was dismantled, due to disuse, in order to increase the capacity of the arena, which is still in demand for shows and other types of events. In 1998, the complex was expanded again to include a sixth event hall and a main reception hall (known as the plaza) designed by the architectural firm Benthem Crouwel. Another expansion take offices, catering facilities as well as smaller conference and meeting rooms were built. The main entrance to the Sportpaleis was also redesigned and the concrete footbridge from the Zuidplein (which was connected to a shopping centre and metro station) was demolished. The bridge was partly removed, so that it now ended at a staircase that led to the square in front of the reception hall. The demolition of the last section started on 3 March 2017, after the bridge had become unsafe due to a truck colliding with one of the bridge's girders earlier that week.

In 2005, a (now removable) cycling track was built in Ahoy for the revived Six Days of Rotterdam racing event. The main arena building was comprehensively modernised between 2010 and 2011. The arena's overall capacity was increased, the capacity was increased by 5,000 (from 10,500) and could now hold around 15,000 spectators following the installation of new grandstands and extra seating. In addition to the new grandstands, Dutch lighting company Signify installed a new custom-made 1,000 m^{2} LED screen wall on the facade of the arena.

In 2017, it was announced that a Pathé cinema would also be built adjacent to the forecourt. The artists' entrance to the main arena was renamed "Door Duncan" in 2020, in honor of Duncan Laurence (who was born in nearby Spijkenisse) who in 2019 brought the Netherlands its first victory in the Eurovision Song Contest since 1975. Since April 2021, the complex has been equipped with 5,200 solar panels which supply large events with sustainable energy 195 days a year. In December 2023, construction of a new parking garage began on Ahoy's old P3 parking lot. The new garage, in between the new Ibis hotel and Ahoy forecourt, has room for 628 cars and was expected to be completed in the last quarter of 2024.

==== RACC and RTM Stage ====
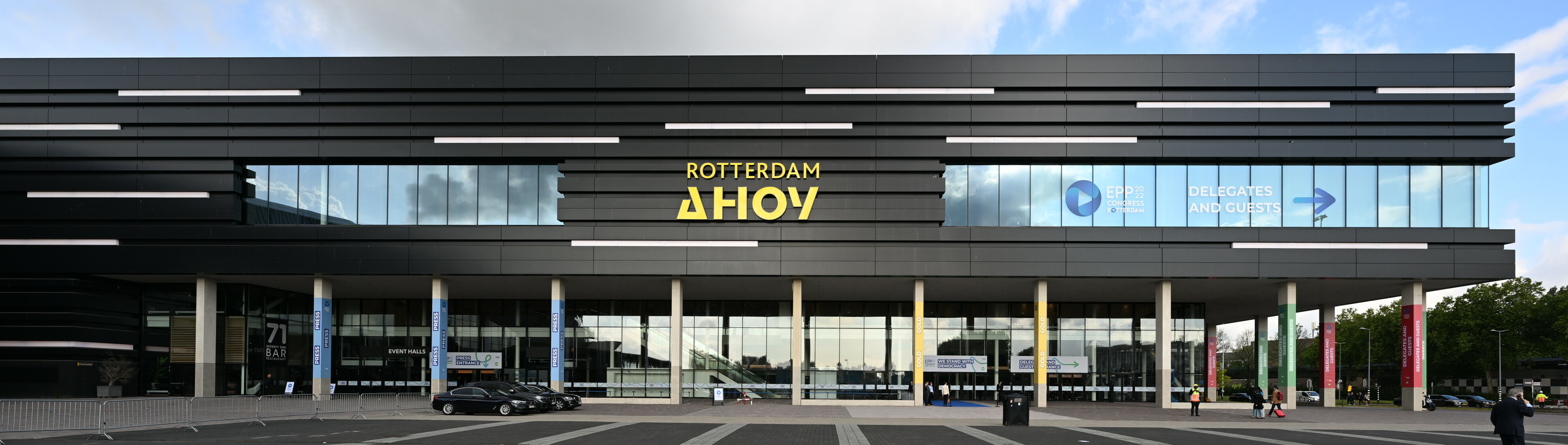
Entrance to RACC and RTM Stage in June 2022

In July 2018, construction work began on an extension to the Ahoy complex. Rotterdam Ahoy Convention Centre (RACC) and RTM Stage, designed by Kraaijvanger Architects, opened at the end of 2020 and is directly connected to the Ahoy Plaza. The new premises, featuring a dual-purpose 7,000-seat concert hall and 2,750-seat auditorium/theatre (expandable to 4,000), adds an additional 35,000 square metres of floor space. On the second and third floors there are 35 break out rooms, varying in capacity from 50 to 1,000, that can be used separately or combined and a 2,300 m^{2} Expo Foyer which can be used for gala dinners, expos and receptions.

== Events ==
=== Sports ===
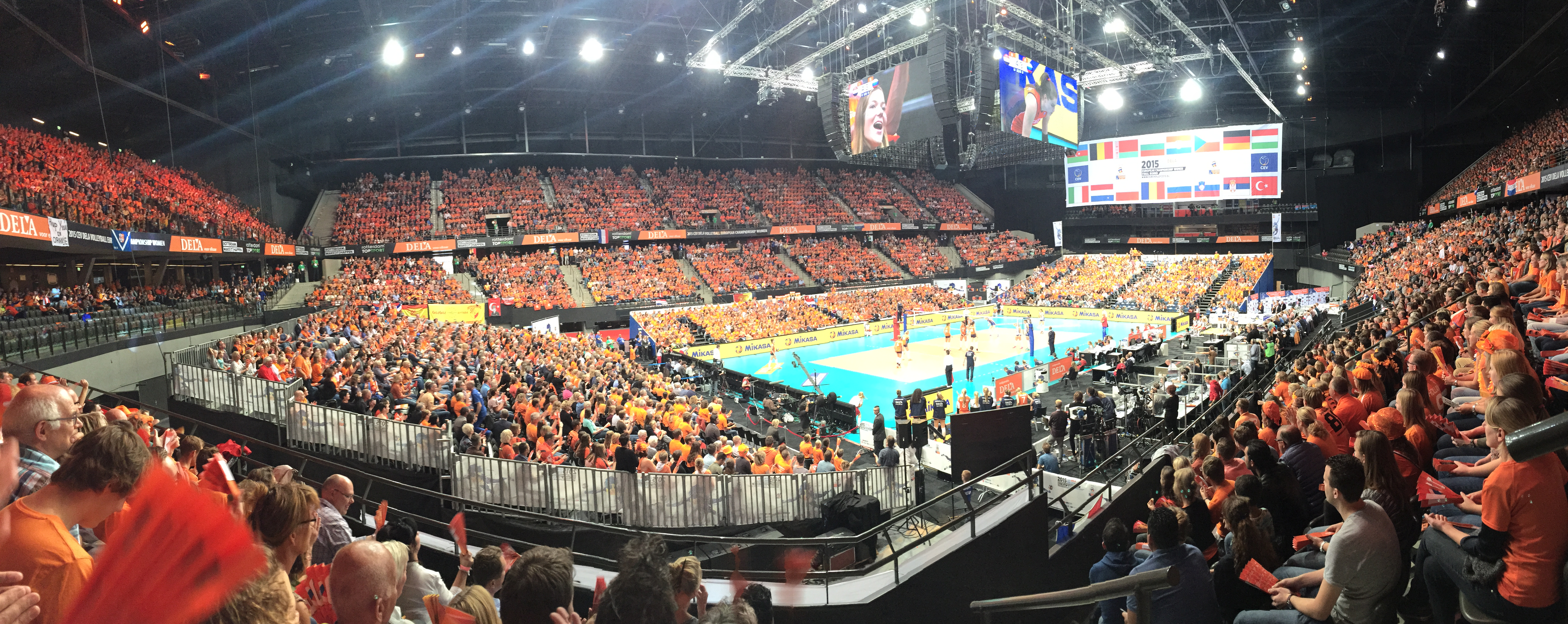
2015 Women's European Volleyball Championship Final at Ahoy Arena

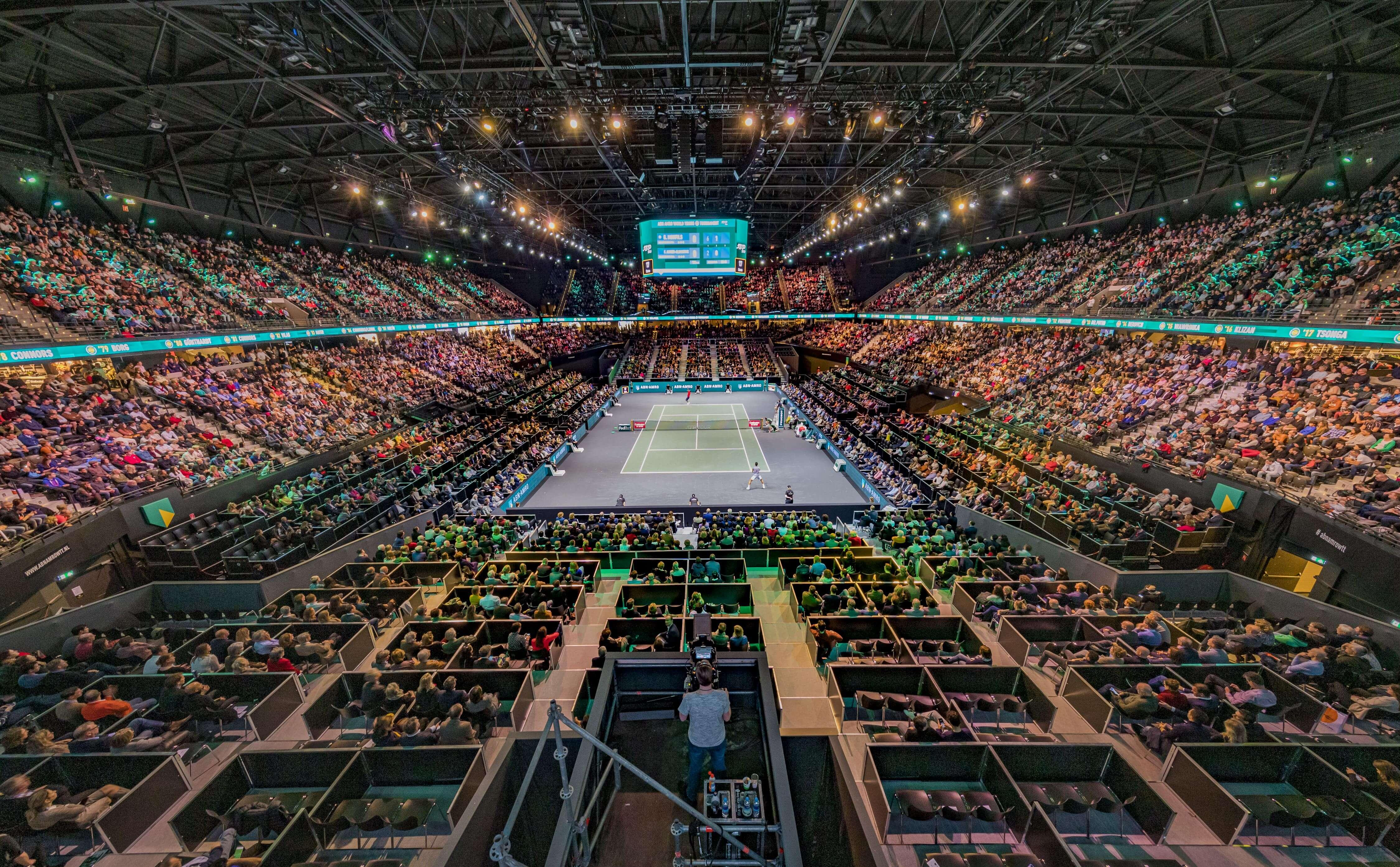
2023 Rotterdam Open at Ahoy

It has hosted sports competitions such as the Rotterdam Open and Six Days of Rotterdam every year and is one of the venues for Premier League Darts since 2016. Other international events held in the arena include:

- 1973 European Athletics Indoor Championships
- 1973 Ice Hockey World Championships
- 1987 World Artistic Gymnastics Championships
- 1989 FIFA Futsal World Championship
- 2009 World Judo Championships
- 2010 World Artistic Gymnastics Championships
- 2011 World Table Tennis Championships
- 2014 UCI BMX World Championships
- 2015 Women's European Volleyball Championship
- 2017 World Short Track Speed Skating Championships
- 2019 Men's European Volleyball Championship
- 2022 FIVB Volleyball Women's World Championship
- 2025 World Women's Handball Championship
- 2026 World Artistic Gymnastics Championships

It was a venue for the European finals of Superstars, the televised all-around sports competition from 1975 to 1977 and again in 1979.

In 2016, the venue hosted the mixed martial arts event UFC Fight Night: Overeem vs. Arlovski.

In 2017, the venue again hosted the UFC for UFC Fight Night: Volkov vs. Struve.

=== Music television ===
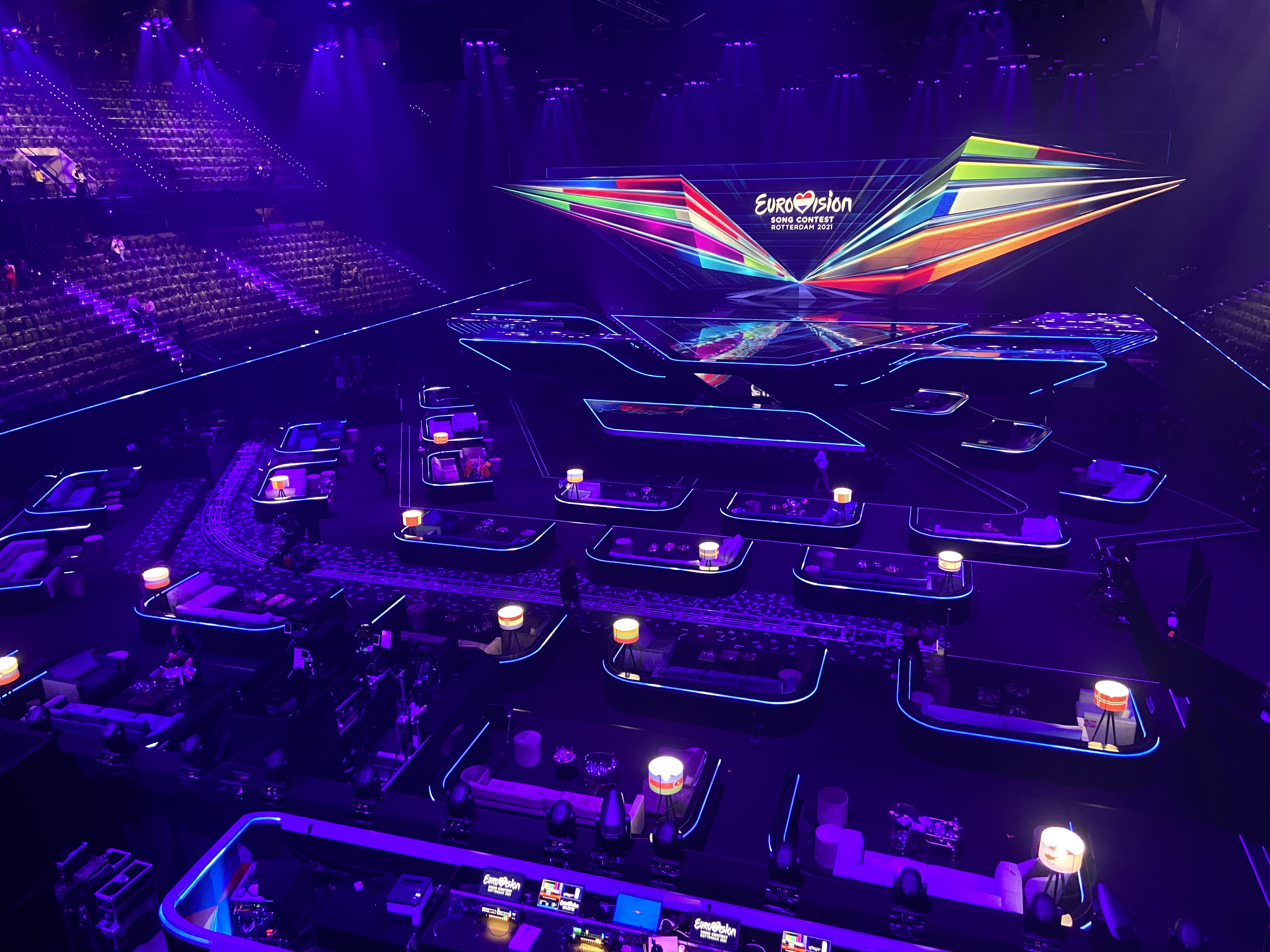
Ahoy during the Eurovision Song Contest 2021

The 1997 and 2016 MTV Europe Music Awards and the Junior Eurovision Song Contest 2007 were also held in the Ahoy Arena. Rotterdam Ahoy was also planned to be the host venue for the Eurovision Song Contest 2020. It would have been the second venue to host both the junior and adult editions of the contest, after the Palace of Sports, Kyiv in Ukraine. On 18 March 2020, the EBU announced the cancellation of the contest due to the COVID-19 pandemic; the arena was later utilised as a field hospital. Instead, Rotterdam Ahoy hosted the Eurovision Song Contest 2021 which took place on 18, 20 and 22 May 2021.

== See also ==
- List of tennis stadiums by capacity
- List of convention centres in the Netherlands
- List of indoor arenas in the Netherlands

Events and tenants
Preceded by Palais des Sports; Grenoble	European Indoor Championships in Athletics; Venue; 1973	Succeeded by Scandinavium; Gothenburg
Preceded by None	FIFA Futsal World Championship; Final Venue; 1989	Succeeded by Hong Kong Coliseum; Hong Kong
Preceded by Sala Polivalentă; Bucharest	Junior Eurovision Song Contest; Venue; 2007	Succeeded by Spyros Kyprianou Athletic Center; Limassol
Preceded by Expo Tel Aviv; Tel Aviv	Eurovision Song Contest; Venue; 2020 (cancelled); 2021	Succeeded by Pala Alpitour; Turin
