= 2005 FIFA World Youth Championship final =

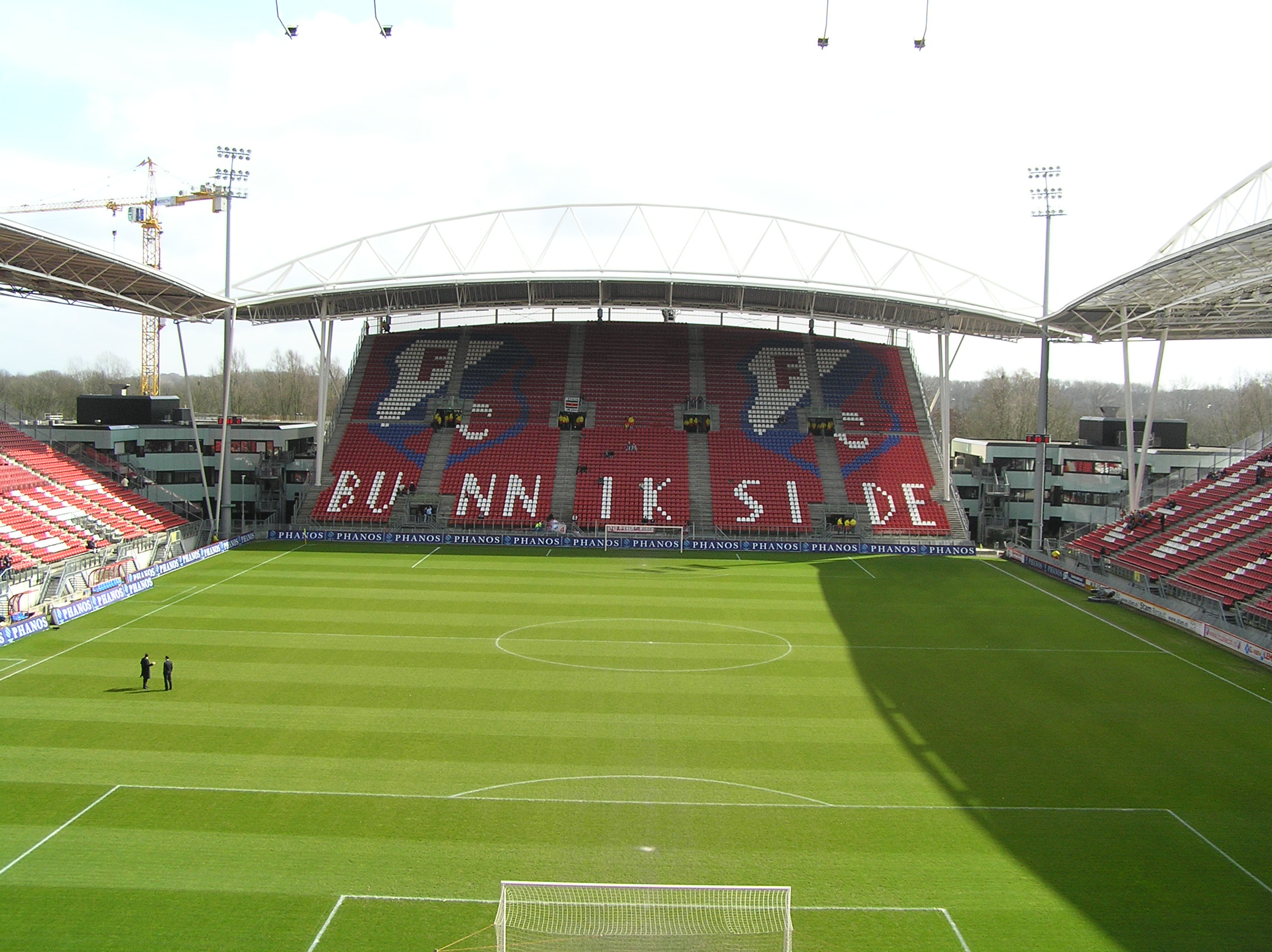
- Stadion Galgenwaard (pictured in 2006) where the match was played
- Event: 2005 FIFA World Youth Championship
Argentina	Nigeria
(Argentina)	(Nigeria)
2	1
- Date: 2 July 2005
- Venue: Stadion Galgenwaard, Utrecht
- Referee: Terje Hauge (Norway)
- Attendance: 24,500

The 2005 FIFA World Youth Championship final was the final match and culmination of the 2005 FIFA World Youth Championship, hosted by the Netherlands. The game was played at the Stadion Galgenwaard in Utrecht on 2 July 2005, and was contested between Argentina and Nigeria. The match was won by Argentina 2–1, obtaining their fifth FIFA U-20 World Cup.

It was the last final of a World Youth Championship, becoming FIFA U-20 World Cup in the 2007 edition in Canada.

== Background ==
Argentina results
Round	Opponent	Result
GS	United States	0–1
GS	Egypt	2–0
GS	Germany	1–0
R16	Colombia	2–1
QF	Spain	3–1
SF	Brazil	2–1

The 2005 World Youth Championship saw the professional debut of Lionel Messi in Argentina's national team. He had previously played a friendly match against Paraguay U20 which ended in a 4–0 victory for Argentina at the Estadio Diego Armando Maradona, organised only to guarantee Messi's allegiance to Argentina, as he was also sought in Spain.

Nigeria results
Round	Opponent	Result
GS	Brazil	0–0
GS	South Korea	1–2
GS	Switzerland	3–0
R16	Ukraine	1–0
QF	Netherlands	1–1 (10–9)
SF	Morocco	3–0

The Argentines were seeking their fifth U-20 title, having previously won the tournament in 1979 in Japan, in 1995 in Qatar, in 1997 in Malaysia, and in 2001 in Argentina. In 2005, Argentina was pooled into Group D, along with the United States, Germany, and Egypt. The opening match saw Argentina lose to the United States 0–1 with a goal scored by Chad Barrett in the 38th minute. The team recovered from the loss in the second group match by defeating Egypt 2–0, with Messi scoring his first goal in the tournament. Argentina ultimately advanced to the knockout stage by winning the last group match against Germany 1–0.

Nigeria had been pooled into Group F, alongside Brazil, South Korea, and Switzerland. The Nigerians were known as a strong youth team seeking their first youth title, having defeated Argentina at the 1996 Summer Olympics in Atlanta in the gold medal match. Nigeria held a 0–0 draw with Brazil in the opening match, losing to the South Koreans 1–2 in the second match, and defeating Switzerland 3–0 in the closing group match.

In the knockout stage, Argentina won the Round of 16 match against Colombia with a last-minute goal by Julio Barroso. The albiceleste went on to defeat Spain 3–1 in the quarter-finals, and Brazil in the semifinal with a last-minute goal by Pablo Zabaleta. The Nigerians defeated Ukraine in the Round of 16 by the minimum margin and the hosts Netherlands in the quarter-finals after a penalty shoot-out ending 10–9. In the semifinal, Nigeria easily defeated Morocco 3–0.

== Match ==
The final match took place at the Stadion Galgenwaard in Utrecht on 2 July 2005 before 24,500 spectators. Norwegian referee Terje Hauge was appointed for the final, with assistant referees Steinar Holvik and Ole Hermann Borgan, also from Norway. The fourth official was Benito Archundia of Mexico.

The match opened in the 40th minute, after Messi dribbled to the goalkeeper's area and was brought down by Dele Adeleye. Messi subsequently scored the penalty kick himself. In the second half, Messi had early chances at goal, but a growing Nigerian defence blocked another goal for Argentina. A rapid advance by the Nigerians equalised the match in the 53rd minute, when Chinedu Obasi scored a goal with a flying header after assistance from the right by Olubayo Adefemi. The draw tensed the match, with the Nigerians advancing further and putting the Argentines at risk. Three substitutions in Argentina refreshed the team, with Sergio Agüero reaching deep into the Nigerian area and falling to the ground after being fouled by Monday James and giving Argentina another penalty kick in the 85th minute. Messi sent the ball towards the left side and tricking goalkeeper Ambruse Vanzekin to his right. The Nigerians angrily protested the penalty to Hauge, arguing that no foul at all had been committed on Agüero. The last minutes showed desperation on Nigeria's players, with left-back Taye Taiwo being shown a yellow card for a deliberate foul on Messi. Gabriel Paletta was also shown a yellow card for a foul and Agüero received a verbal warning for time-wasting. Argentina waited out the four minutes of stoppage time to win their fifth world title at under-20 level.

== Summary ==
2 July 2005
20:00

Argentina	2–1	Nigeria
Messi 40' (pen.), 75' (pen.)	Report	Obasi 53'

Stadion Galgenwaard, Utrecht
Attendance: 24,500
Referee: Terje Hauge (Norway)

Argentina	Nigeria

GK	1	Óscar Ustari
CB	4	Julio Barroso
CB	6	Gabriel Paletta	(yellow card) 80'
CB	13	Ezequiel Garay
RWB	8	Pablo Zabaleta (c)
LWB	3	Lautaro Formica
RM	18	Lionel Messi	(yellow card) 76'
CM	17	Fernando Gago		(substituted off) 72'
CM	5	Juan Manuel Torres
LM	15	Rodrigo Archubi		(substituted off) 61'
CF	20	Gustavo Oberman		(substituted off) 57'
Substitutes:
FW	19	Sergio Agüero	(yellow card) 90+2'	(substituted on) 57'
FW	11	Emiliano Armenteros		(substituted on) 61'
MF	7	Lucas Biglia		(substituted on) 72'
Manager:
Francisco Ferraro

GK	1	Ambruse Vanzekin	(yellow card) 74'
RB	13	Olubayo Adefemi
CB	17	Dele Adeleye
CB	5	Monday James	(yellow card) 14'
LB	14	David Abwo		(substituted off) 85'
RM	10	Isaac Promise (c)
CM	19	Sani Kaita	(yellow card) 32'
CM	9	Mikel John Obi
LM	3	Taye Taiwo	(yellow card) 78'
CF	7	Chinedu Obasi
CF	20	John Owoeri
Substitutes:
FW	11	Solomon Okoronkwo		(substituted on) 85'
Manager:
Samson Siasia

Assistant referees:
Steinar Holvik (Norway)
Ole Hermann Borgan (Norway)
Fourth official:
Benito Archundia (Mexico)

== Legacy ==
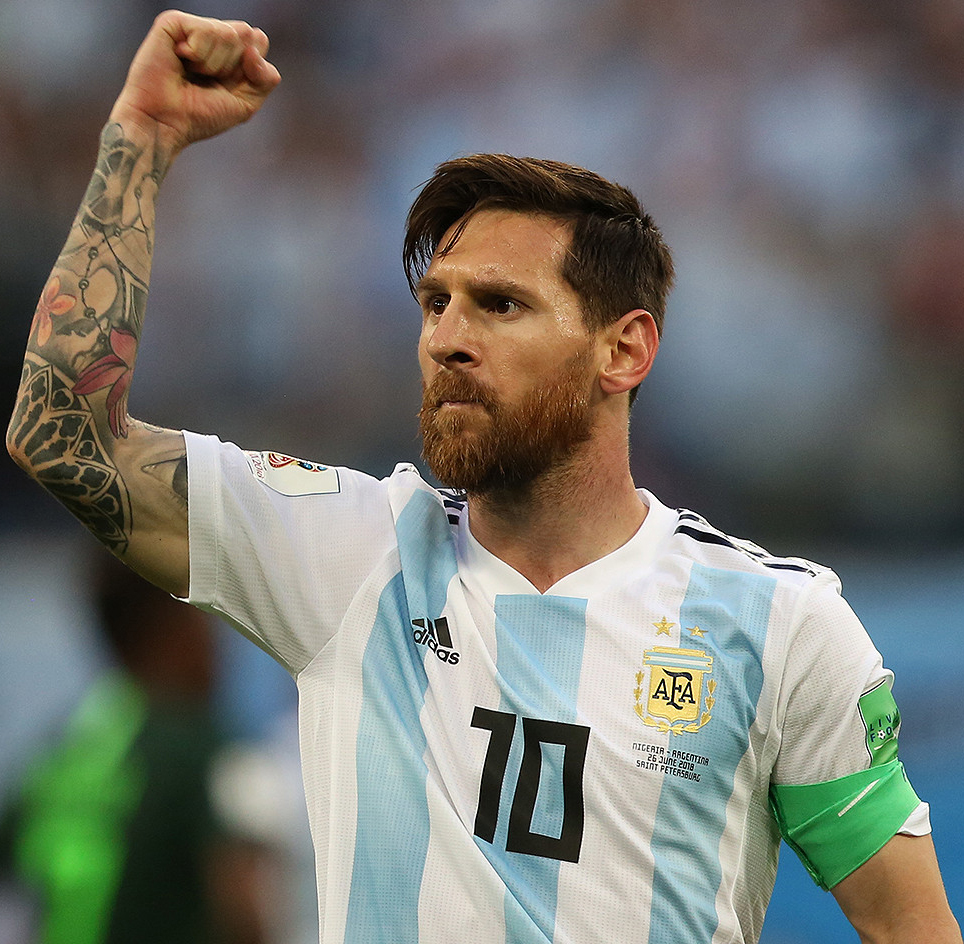
The final intensified the rivalry between Argentina and Nigeria and was the first title for Messi with Argentina.

The 2005 tournament was considered the breakthrough of Lionel Messi's first steps in the national team, beginning a highly successful career with Argentina, where he won two Copa América titles. First in 2021 against hosts Brazil and against Colombia in the 2024 championship in the United States. Messi's most important achievement with Argentina came in the 2022 FIFA World Cup in Qatar, where he led Argentina to win its third world title by defeating France in the final. The match also fuelled the rivalry between Argentina and Nigeria.

Despite a remarkable history at youth tournaments, Nigeria has never been able to obtain the title, with Ghana being the first African country to win the cup at the 2009 FIFA U-20 World Cup in Egypt, defeating Brazil in the final.

Messi won the Golden Ball and the Golden Boot, as the most valuable player and top scorer player of the tournament, respectively.

Argentina would go on to win back-to-back championship and its sixth FIFA youth title in the first edition of the FIFA U-20 World Cup in 2007 in Canada, where the team defeated the Czech Republic in the final.
