= List of indoor arenas in the Netherlands =

This is a list of notable indoor arenas in the Netherlands. Indoor stadiums with a capacity of 1,000 or higher are included.

== Constructed ==
City/town	Arena/theatre	Date built	Capacity	Image
Amsterdam	Ziggo Dome	2012	16,000	
Amsterdam	Jaap Edenhal	1973	4,500	
Amsterdam	Sporthallen Zuid	1975	2,525	
Amsterdam	Blauw-Wit hal	1985	1,000	
Rotterdam	Rotterdam Ahoy	1971	15,818	
Rotterdam	Topsportcentrum Rotterdam	2000	2,500	
Heerenveen	Thialf	1986	12,500	
Apeldoorn	Omnisport Apeldoorn	2008	5,000	
Alkmaar	Sportpaleis Alkmaar	1964	4,750	
Groningen	MartiniPlaza	1969	4,350	
Nijmegen	Jan Massinkhal	1980	4,300	
Nijmegen	Triavium	1996	1,450	
Eindhoven	Indoor Sportcentrum-Eindhoven	1993	4,000	
Eindhoven	IJssportcentrum Eindhoven	1981	1,700	
Utrecht	Vechtsebanen	1970	4,000	
Utrecht	Sportcentrum Galgenwaard	2003	1,350	
The Hague	Sportcampus Zuiderpark	2017	3,500	
The Hague	De Uithof	1989	2,610	
The Hague	Hellashal	1983	1,200	
The Hague	Sporthal Overbosch	1971	1,200	
The Hague	Sporthal Ockenburgh	1979	1,050	
's-Hertogenbosch	Maaspoort	1982	3,500	
Zoetermeer	PWA Silverdome	2002	3,500	
Dordrecht	Sportboulevard Dordrecht	2010	3,250	
Dordrecht	DeetosSnelhal	2011	1,250	
Almere	Topsportcentrum	2007	3,076	
Arnhem	Sportcentrum Valkenhuizen	2020 (renovation)	3,000	
Enschede	IJsbaan Twente	2008	3,000	
Tilburg	IJssportcentrum Tilburg	1998	2,575	
Tilburg	Sportcomplex T-Kwadraat	2009	1,500	
Sittard	Fletcher Wellness-Hotel Sittard	2013	2,500	
Sittard	Stadssporthal Sittard	1978	1,000	
Amstelveen	Emergohal	1985	2,500	
Leiden	Sportcomplex 1574	2023	2,435	
Leiden	Vijf Meihal	1968	2,000	
Panningen	SportArena De Heuf	1982	2,200	
Hoogeveen	Sporthal Het Activum	2016	2,100	
Driebergen	Sporthal Hoenderdaal	1983	2,000	
Leek	Sportcentrum Leek	1984	2,000	
Emmen	Sporthal Angelslo	1985	1,700	
Doetinchem	Topsporthal Achterhoek	2014	1,650	
Delft	Fortunahal	1987	1,500	
Papendrecht	PKC-hal	1981	1,500	
Sneek	Sneker Sporthal	1967	1,500	
Leeuwarden	Kalverdijkje	2014 (renovation)	1,450	
Gorredijk	Sportcentrum Kortezwaag	1994	1,400	
Den Helder	Sporthal Quelderduijn	2024 (renovation)	1,250	
Geleen	Glanerbrook IJshal	1968	1,200	
Koog aan de Zaan	Topsportcentrum De Koog	2016	1,200	
Nijeveen	Sporthal de Eendracht	1980	1,200	
Volendam	Sporthal de Opperdam	1986	1,200	
Zwolle	Landstede Sportcentrum	2010	1,200	
Almelo	Topsportcentrum IISPA	2010	1,144	
Bemmel	Sportcentrum De Kooi	2021 (renovation)	1,100	
Ede	Van der Knaaphal	2018	1,100	
Bennekom	DVO/Transus-Hal	1986	1,000	
Kwintsheul	Eekhout Hal	1979	1,000	
Sliedrecht	Sporthal De Basis	2017	1,000	
Weert	Sporthal Boshoven	1982	1,000	

== Future ==
City/town	Arena/theatre	Date built	Capacity	Image
Geleen	Nieuwe ijshal	2025	1,450	

== See also ==
- List of indoor arenas in Europe
- List of indoor arenas by capacity
- List of football stadiums in the Netherlands
- Lists of stadiums
