= Stadion Galgenwaard =

Football stadium in Utrecht

Coordinates: 52°04′42″N 5°08′45″E

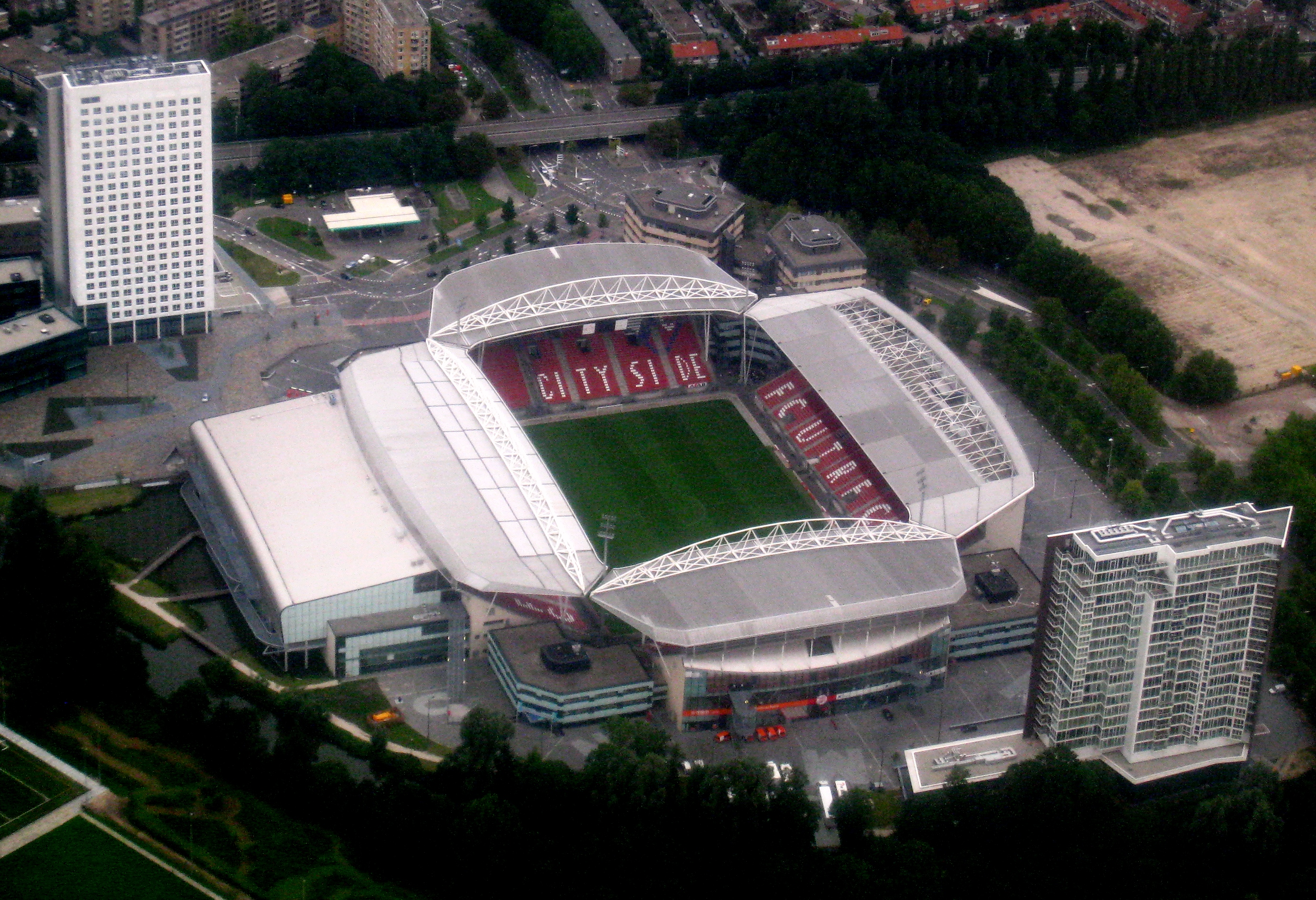
- Galgenwaard from above

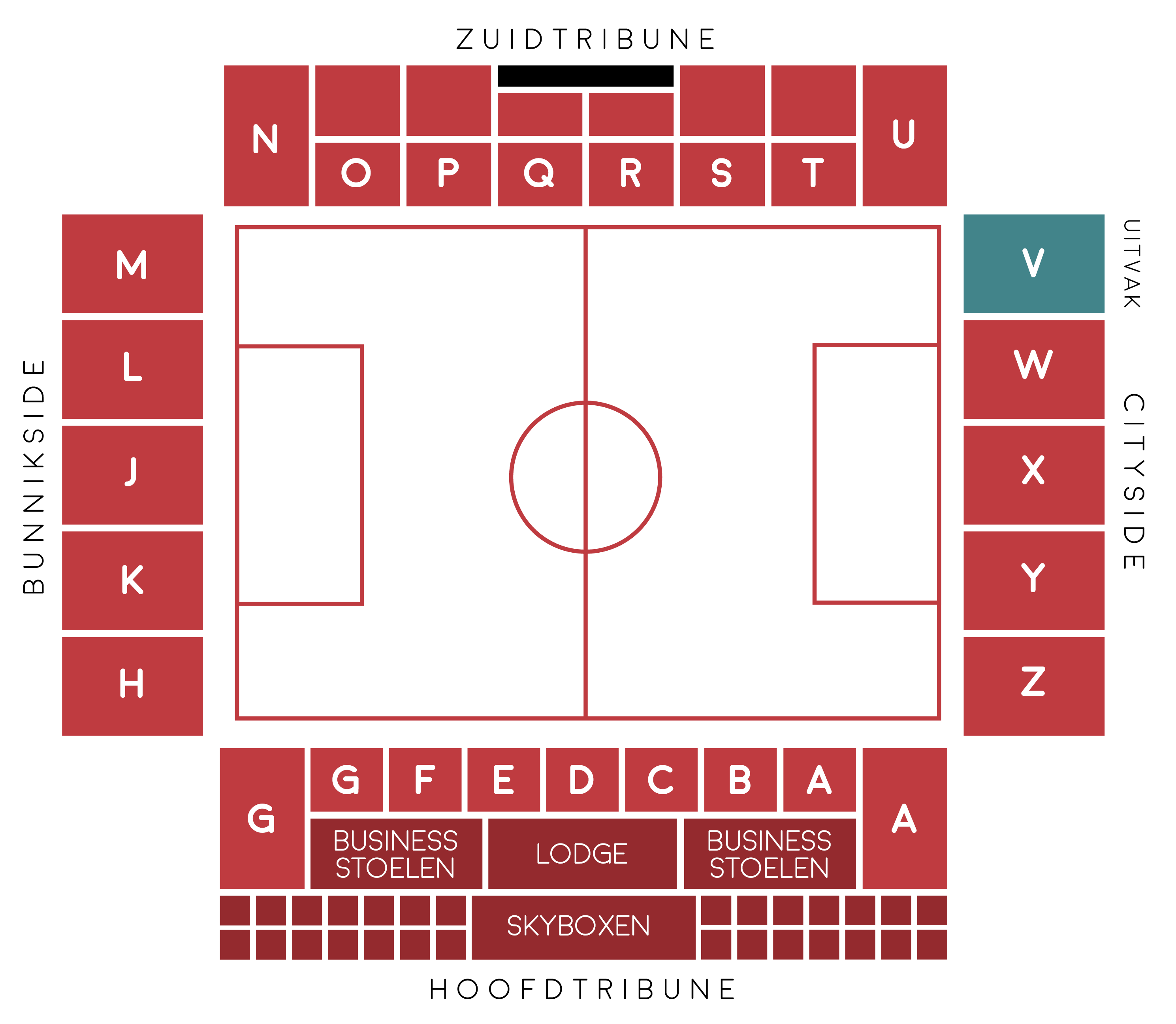
- Full name: Stadion Galgenwaard
- Former names: Stadion Nieuw Galgenwaard
- Location: Utrecht, Netherlands
- Capacity: 23,750
- Surface: Hybrid
- Scoreboard: Yes
- Field size: 105 × 68 m
- Public transit: Utrecht sneltram station 'FC Utrecht stadium'

Construction
- Built: 1930s
- Opened: 21 May 1936
- Renovated: 1981–1982; 2000–2004
- Architects: Zwarts & Jansma Architecten

Tenant
- FC Utrecht (1970–present)

Stadion Galgenwaard (Dutch pronunciation: [ˌstaːdijɔŋ ˈɣɑlɣə(ɱ)ʋaːrt]) is a football stadium in Utrecht, Netherlands. It has been the home of the FC Utrecht since 1970. The stadium, which underwent a renovation starting at the beginning of the 21st century, has a capacity of 23,750 spectators.

The stadium reopened in 1982 after an extensive facelift. At the time, it was one of the most modern stadiums in the world, primarily due to the moat around the pitch. After twenty years, FC Utrecht felt the need for expansion and renewal. The main stand was moved to the North side and opened for the start of the 2001–2002 season.

The old main stand was rebuilt after that, and a year later, FC Utrecht had two new stands on either side of the pitch. Last season, the goal stands were replaced, and the stadium now has 23,750 seats.

Seven international matches of the Netherlands national football team have been played in the stadium. The first was a friendly on 27 April 1983 against Sweden, which ended 3–0 for the visitors. The most recent, played on 3 September 2004, was also a friendly: a 3–0 win against Liechtenstein.

The stadium was also the host of 2 World Cup finals. In 1998, the Netherlands field hockey team became world champions, beating Spain in the final 3–2. In 2005, the final of the Football World Youth Championship was played in the Galgenwaard. Argentina won, beating Nigeria 2–1.

During the UEFA Women's Euro 2017, the stadium hosted 4 group stage matches.

== In music ==
From 19 to 22 June 1987, Prince performed four sold-out concerts at Galgenwaard. A recording of the 20 June show was included on the "Super Deluxe" edition of the Sign o' the Times 2020 reissue.

== Gallery ==
Stadion Galgenwaard

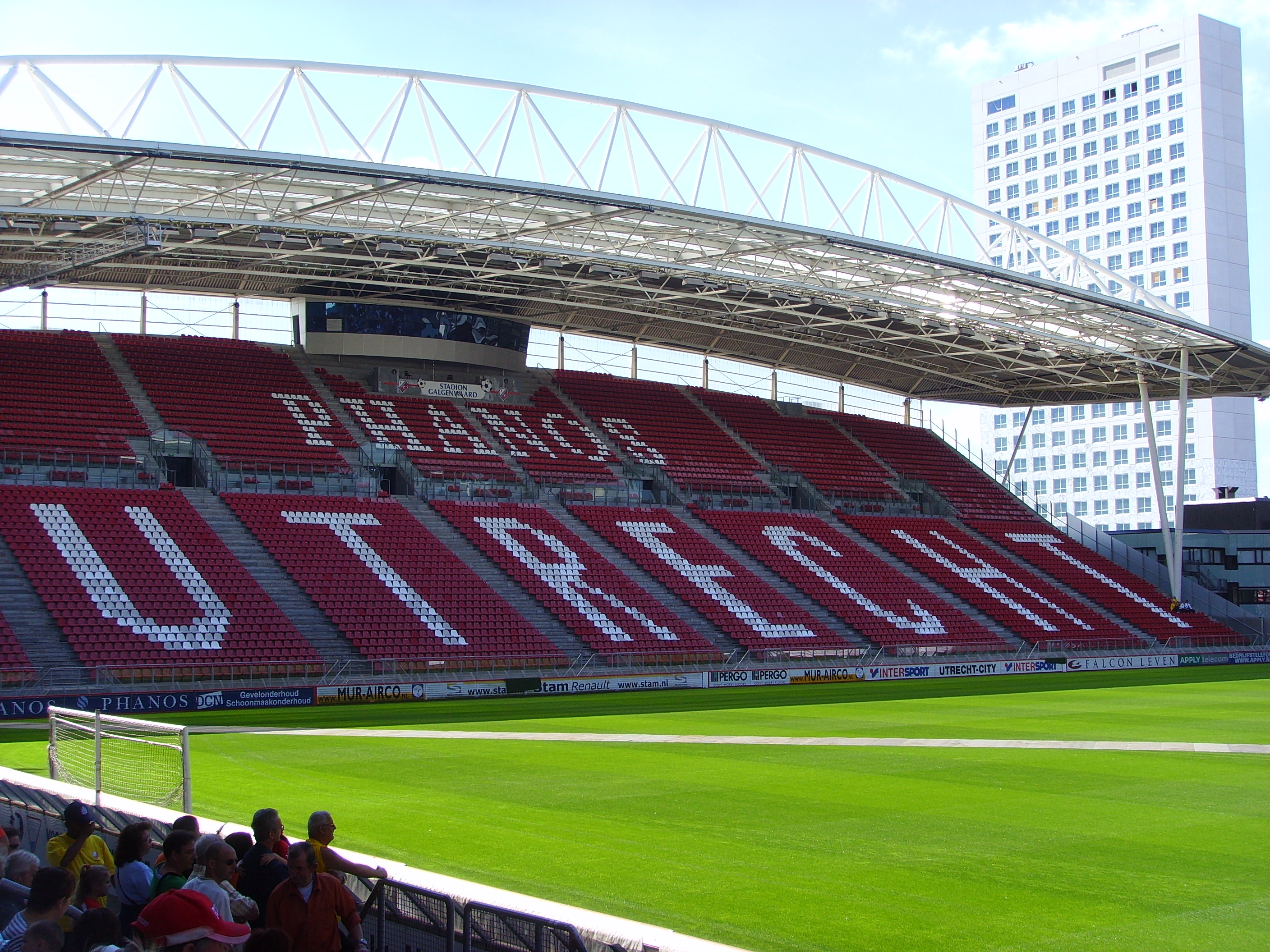
The interior of Stadion Galgenwaard

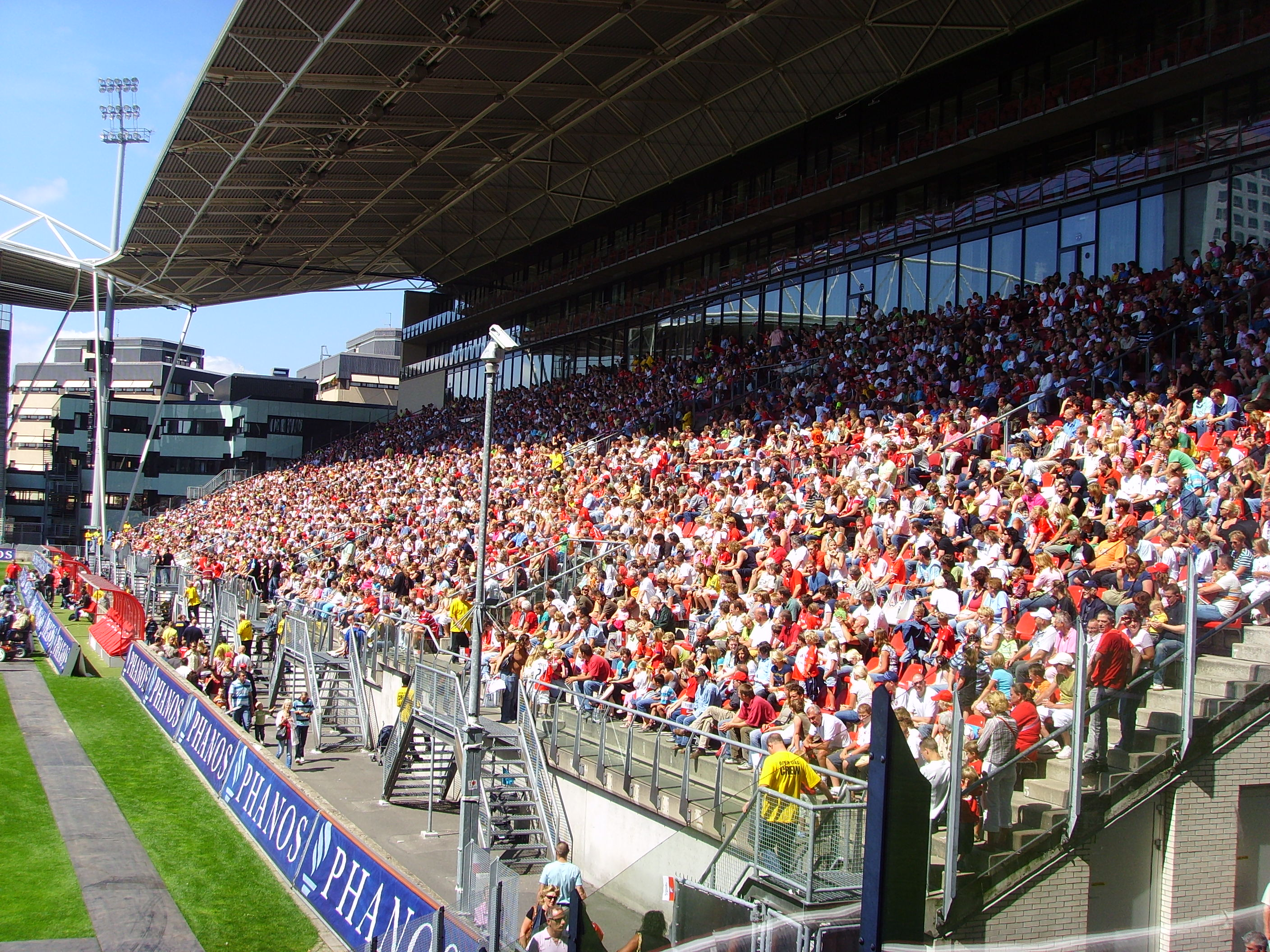
Another view of the interior of Stadion Galgenwaard

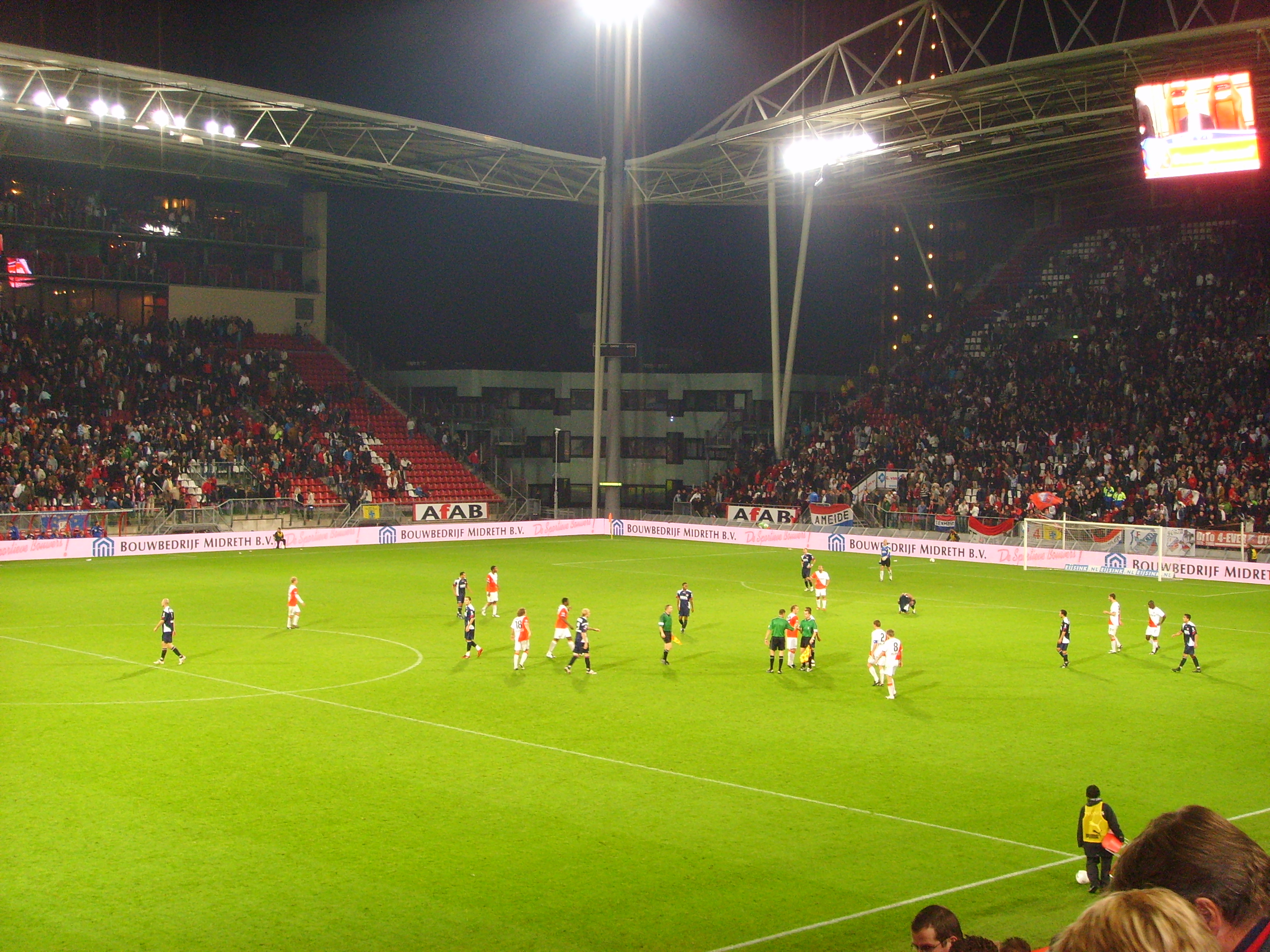
Stadion Galgenwaard during a home game of FC Utrecht

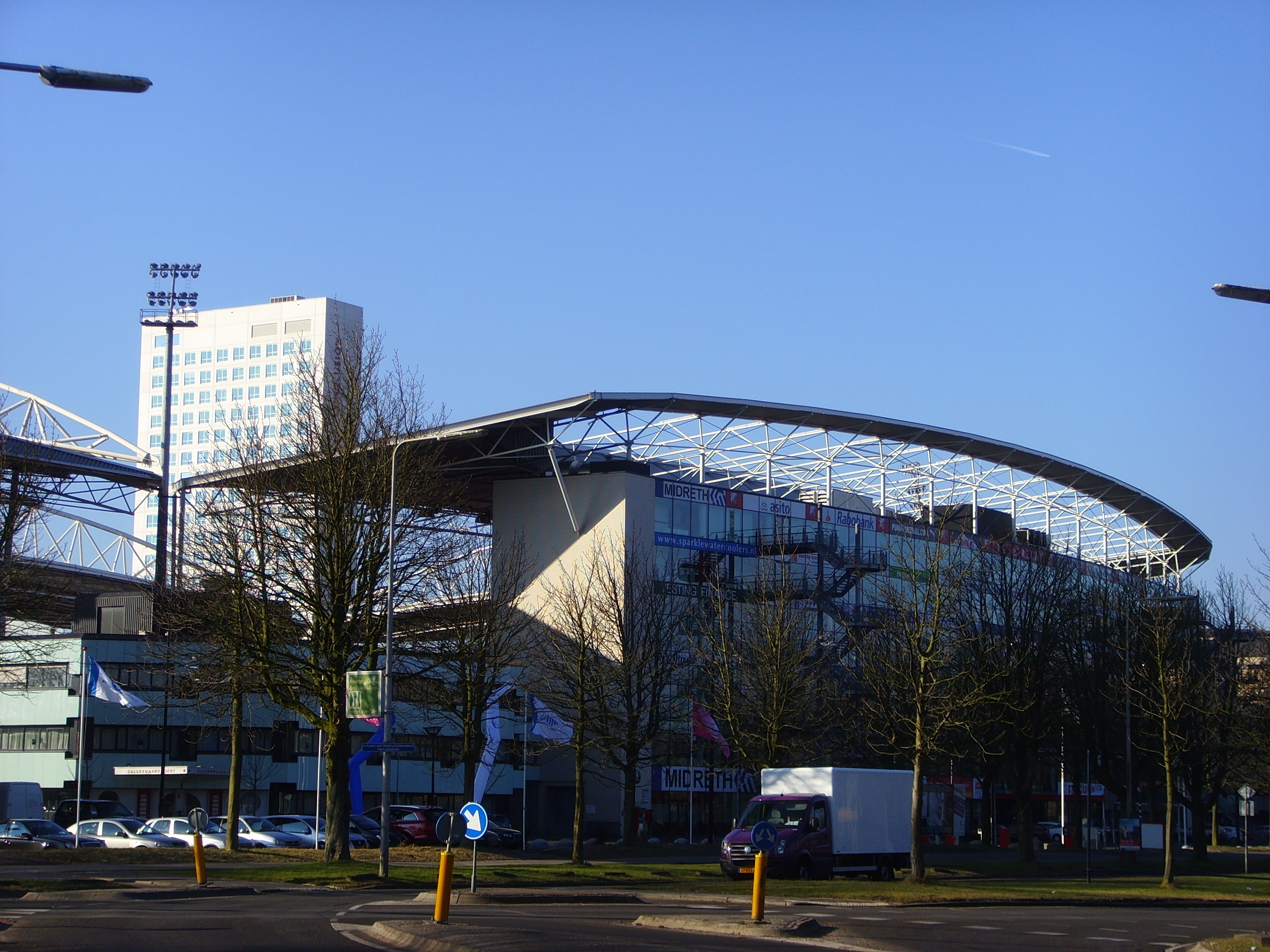
The exterior of Stadion Galgenwaard

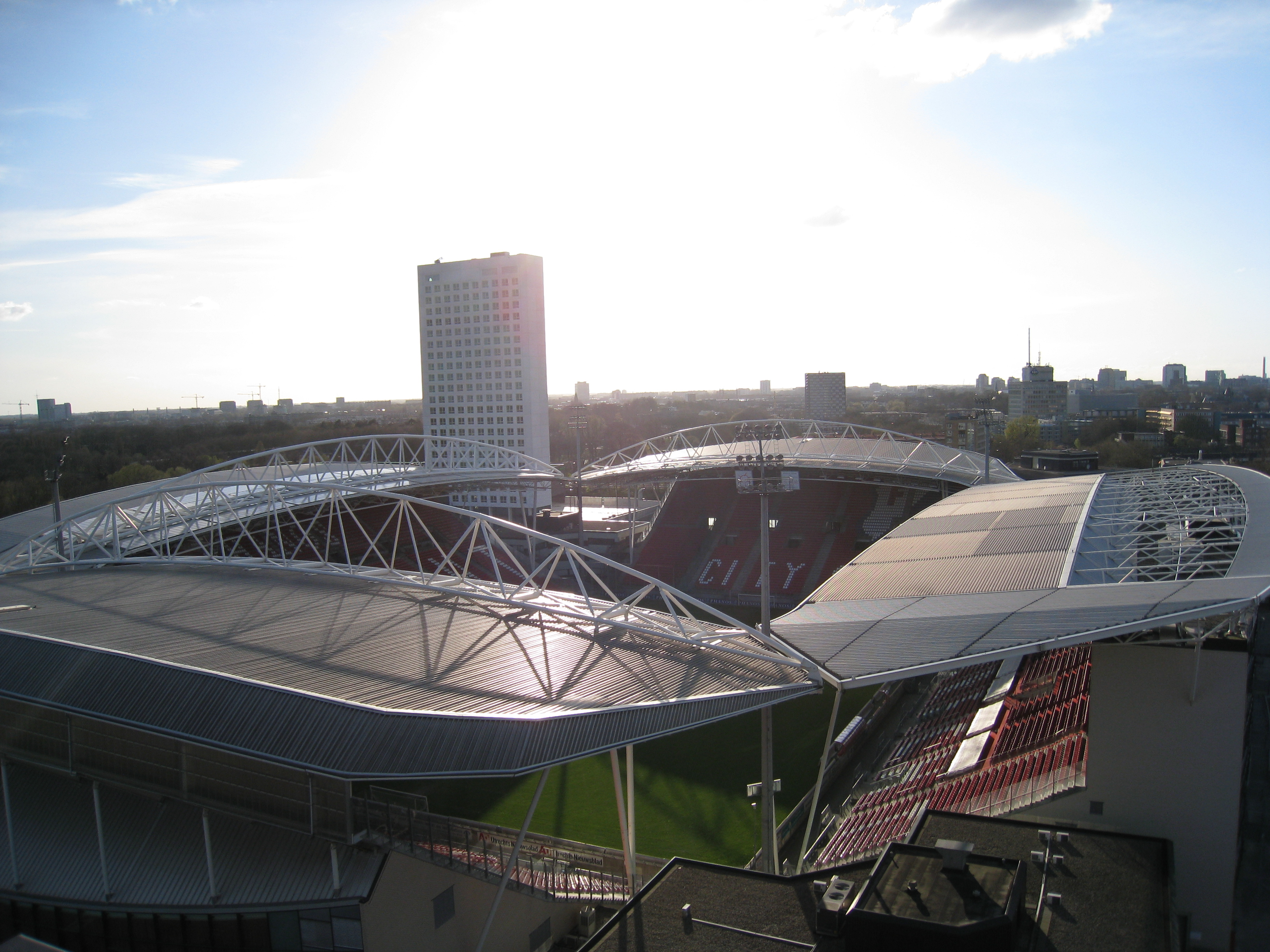
An aerial view of Stadion Galgenwaard

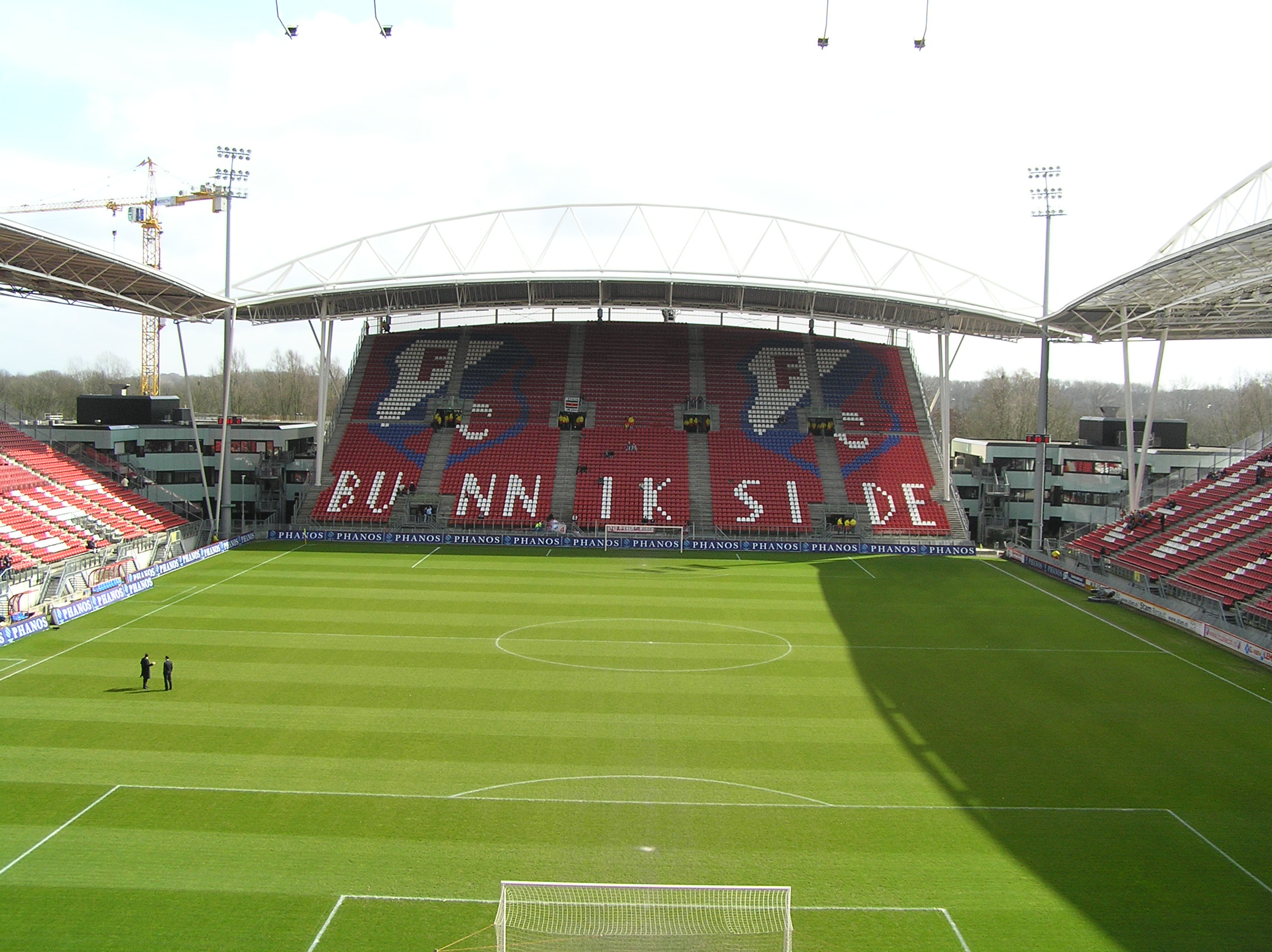
View on the Bunnikside

== See also ==
- Lists of stadiums
- List of football stadiums in the Netherlands

Preceded by Sheikh Zayed Stadium; Abu Dhabi	FIFA World Youth Championship; Final Venue; 2005	Succeeded by National Soccer Stadium; Toronto
