= Monday James =

Nigerian footballer

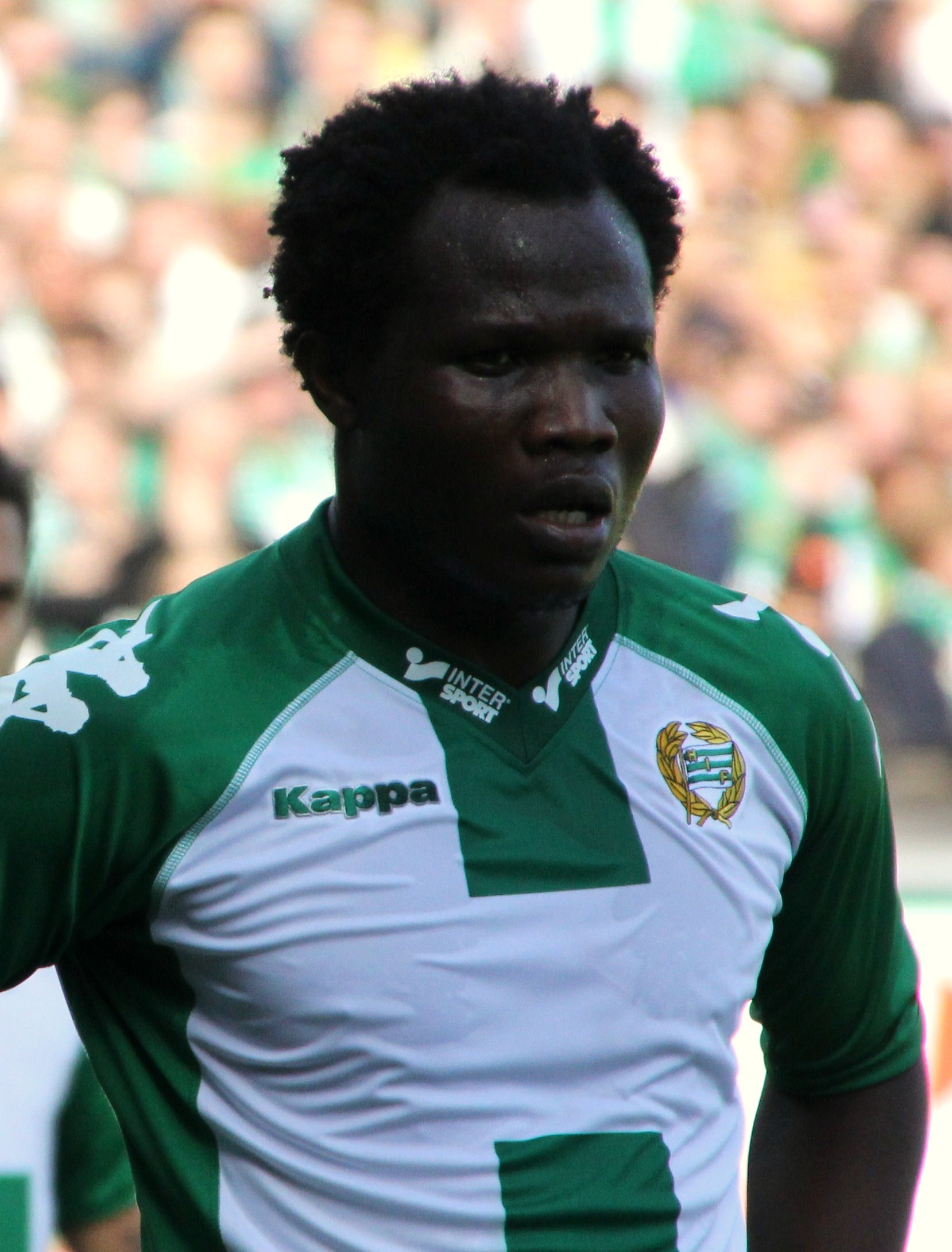
- James in 2013

Personal information
- Date of birth: 19 October 1986 (age 40)
- Place of birth: Lagos, Nigeria
- Height: 1.88 m (6 ft 2 in)
- Position: Centre back

Youth career
- –2002: Bendel Insurance

Senior career*
Years	Team	Apps	(Gls)
2002–2005	Bendel Insurance	70	(5)
2006–2009	Bayelsa United	83	(2)
2008-2009	→ Hammarby IF (loan)	8	(0)
2009–2013	Hammarby IF	24	(0)
2014–2015	Bayelsa United	30	(3)

International career
2005	Nigeria U20	20	(0)
2008	Nigeria U23	11	(0)
2008	Nigeria	4	(1)
- * Club domestic league appearances and goals

Olympic medal record

Representing Nigeria

Men's Football
Silver medal – second place	2008 Beijing	Team competition

Monday James (born 19 October 1986) is a Nigerian former professional footballer who played as a defender.

== Club career ==
James began his career with Bendel Insurance before being transferred to Bayelsa United in January 2006.

He went on a five-month loan to Swedish club Hammarby IF in November 2008 after a couple of games with the club, where there is a clause in the loan that gives Hammarby the option to buy him when the loan ends. On 7 June 2009 Hammarby IF reported that they would buy James and he would be given a four-year contract.

As of June 2010, James was sidelined for an extended period of time after medical examinations raised concerns about a possible heart condition, though he did not sustain any injury that prevented him from playing.

29 June 2011, James extended his contract with Hammarby IF for another two years, playing 17 games in 2011, 6 games in 2012 and played 15 games in 2013.

== International career ==
He represented his country at the 2008 Beijing Olympics, was part of the Nigerian team during the 2005 FIFA World Youth Championship, and played the final match against Argentina, where he committed the foul of the second penalty kick on Sergio Agüero, which was subsequently scored by Lionel Messi.

== Honours ==
- Olympic Games: Silver medalist, 2008
- FIFA U-20 World Cup: Runners-up, 2005
