= List of football stadiums in the Netherlands =

The following is a list of football stadiums in the Netherlands, ranked in order of capacity, with the minimum capacity being 4,000. Stadiums in bold are part of the 2025–26 Eredivisie. The first table shows the stadiums used by professional football clubs.

== Current stadiums ==
#	Image	Stadium	Capacity	City	Province	Home team	Opened	UEFA rank
1		**Johan Cruijff ArenA**	56,120	Amsterdam	North Holland	Ajax	1996	4/4 stars
2		**De Kuip**	47,500	Rotterdam	South Holland	Feyenoord	1936	4/4 stars
3		**Philips Stadion**	35,119	Eindhoven	North Brabant	PSV	1916	4/4 stars
4		**De Grolsch Veste**	30,205	Enschede	Overijssel	FC Twente	1998	
5		**Abe Lenstra Stadion**	27,224	Heerenveen	Friesland	SC Heerenveen	1994	
6		GelreDome	25,000	Arnhem	Gelderland	Vitesse	1998	4/4 stars
7		**Stadion Galgenwaard**	23,750	Utrecht	Utrecht	FC Utrecht	1982	
8		**Euroborg**	22,550	Groningen	Groningen	FC Groningen	2006	
9		Olympisch Stadion	22,288	Amsterdam	North Holland	No tenant	1928	
10		**Rat Verlegh Stadion**	20,500	Breda	North Brabant	NAC Breda	1996	
11		Parkstad Limburg Stadion	19,979	Kerkrade	(Limburg (Netherlands)) Limburg	Roda JC Kerkrade	2000	
12		**AFAS Stadion**	19,391	Alkmaar	North Holland	AZ Alkmaar	2006	
13		Bingoal Stadion	15,000	The Hague	South Holland	ADO Den Haag	2007	
14		Kooi Stadion	15,000	Leeuwarden	Friesland	SC Cambuur	2024	
15		Koning Willem II Stadion	14,637	Tilburg	North Brabant	Willem II	1920	
16		**MAC³PARK stadion**	14,000	Zwolle	Overijssel	PEC Zwolle	2009	
17		**Fortuna Sittard Stadion**	12,800	Sittard	(Limburg (Netherlands)) Limburg	Fortuna Sittard	1999	
18		Stadion De Vijverberg	12,600	Doetinchem	Gelderland	De Graafschap	1954	
19		**Goffertstadion**	12,501	Nijmegen	Gelderland	NEC Nijmegen	1939	
20		**Asito Stadion**	12,080	Almelo	Overijssel	Heracles Almelo	1999	
21		**Sparta Stadion Het Kasteel**	11,026	Rotterdam	South Holland	Sparta Rotterdam	1916	
22		Stadion De Geusselt	10,000	Maastricht	(Limburg (Netherlands)) Limburg	MVV Maastricht	1961	
23		**De Adelaarshorst**	10,000	Deventer	Overijssel	Go Ahead Eagles	1920	
24		Stadion De Vliert	9,000	's-Hertogenbosch	North Brabant	FC Den Bosch	1951	
25		De Oude Meerdijk	8,600	Emmen	Drenthe	FC Emmen	1977	
26		Covebo Stadion – De Koel –	8,000	Venlo	(Limburg (Netherlands)) Limburg	VVV-Venlo	1972	
27		Mandemakers Stadion	7,508	Waalwijk	North Brabant	RKC Waalwijk	1996	
28		**Kras Stadion**	7,384	Volendam	North Holland	FC Volendam	1975	
29		**BUKO Stadion**	6,000	Velsen-Zuid	North Holland	SC Telstar	1949	
30		Frans Heesenstadion	4,662	Oss	North Brabant	TOP Oss	2000	
31		Yanmar Stadion	4,501	Almere	Flevoland	Almere City FC	2005	
32		**Van Donge & De Roo Stadion**	4,500	Rotterdam	South Holland	Excelsior	1902	
33		Jan Louwers Stadion	4,373	Eindhoven	North Brabant	FC Eindhoven	1934	
34		Riwal Hoogwerkers Stadion	4,088	Dordrecht	South Holland	FC Dordrecht	1948	
35		GS Staalwerken Stadion	3,600	Helmond	North Brabant	Helmond Sport	2025	

== Other stadiums ==
Other football stadiums in the Netherlands with a capacity of 4,000 or higher.

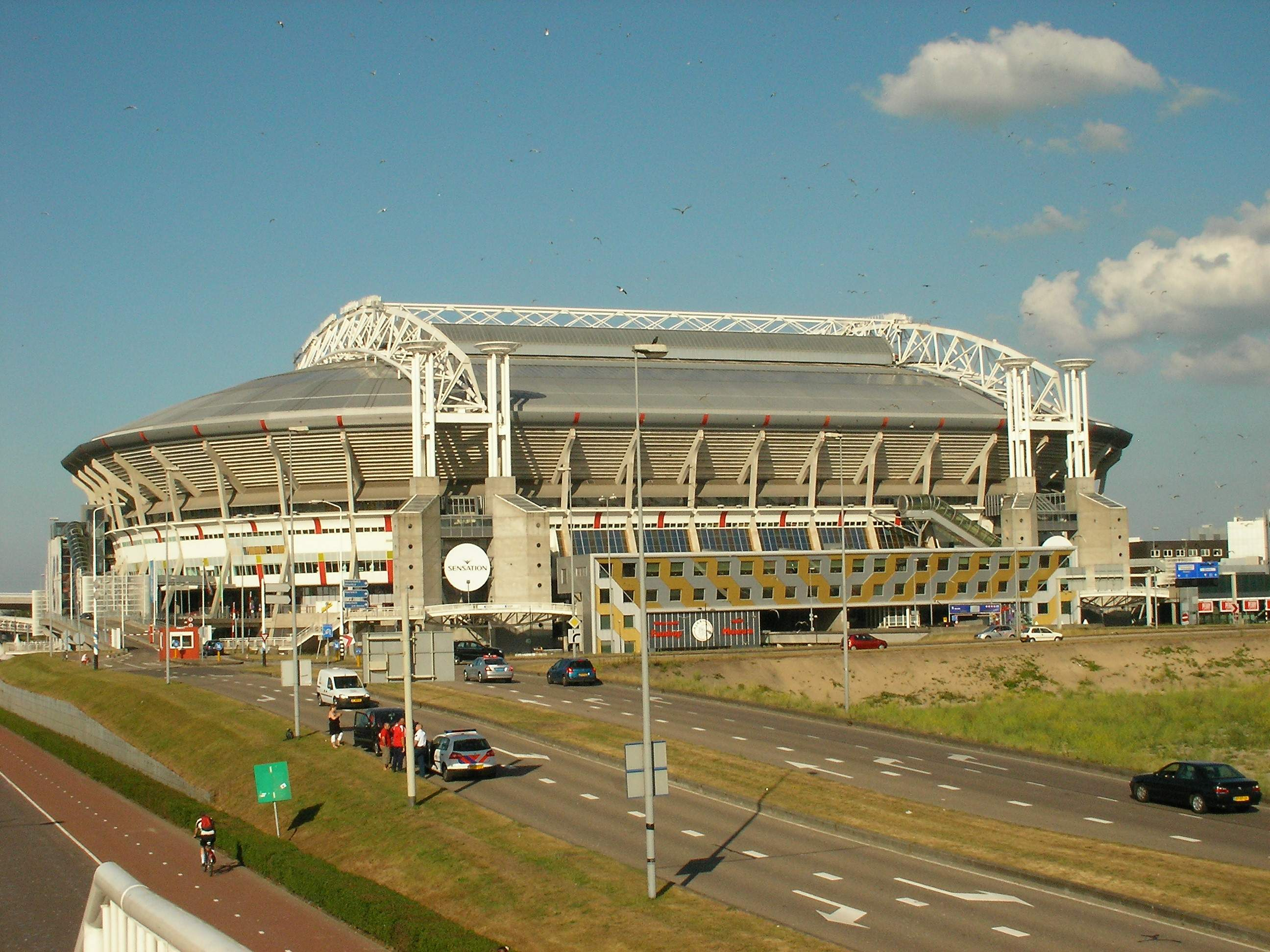
The exterior of the Johan Cruijff ArenA.

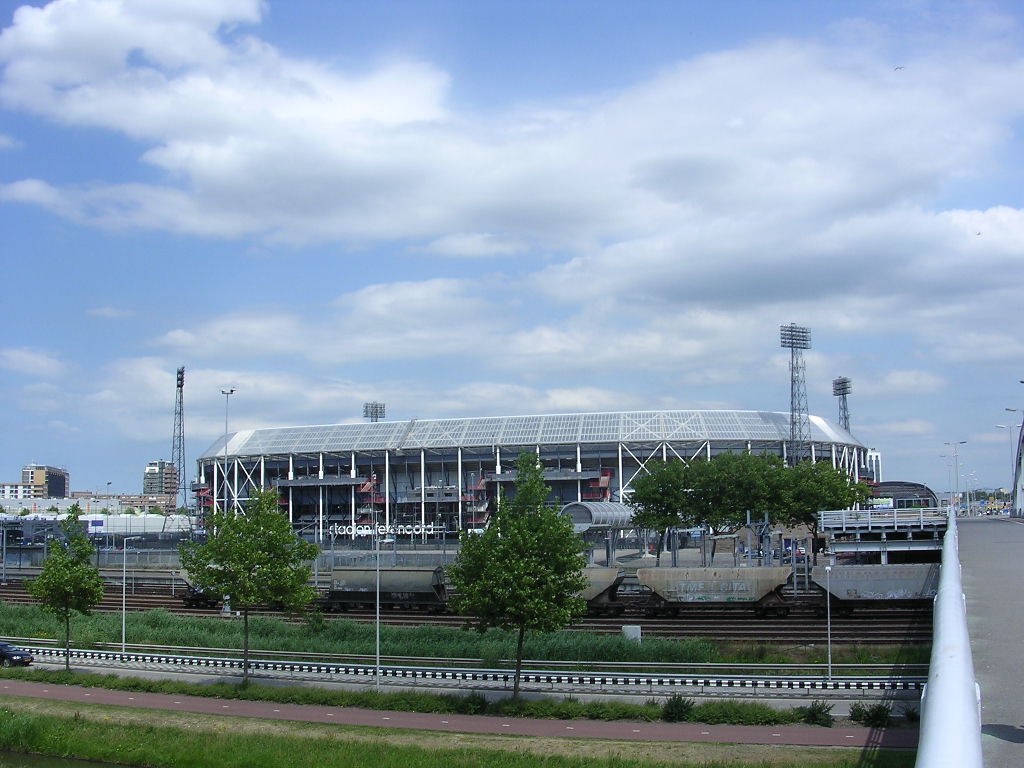
The exterior of De Kuip.

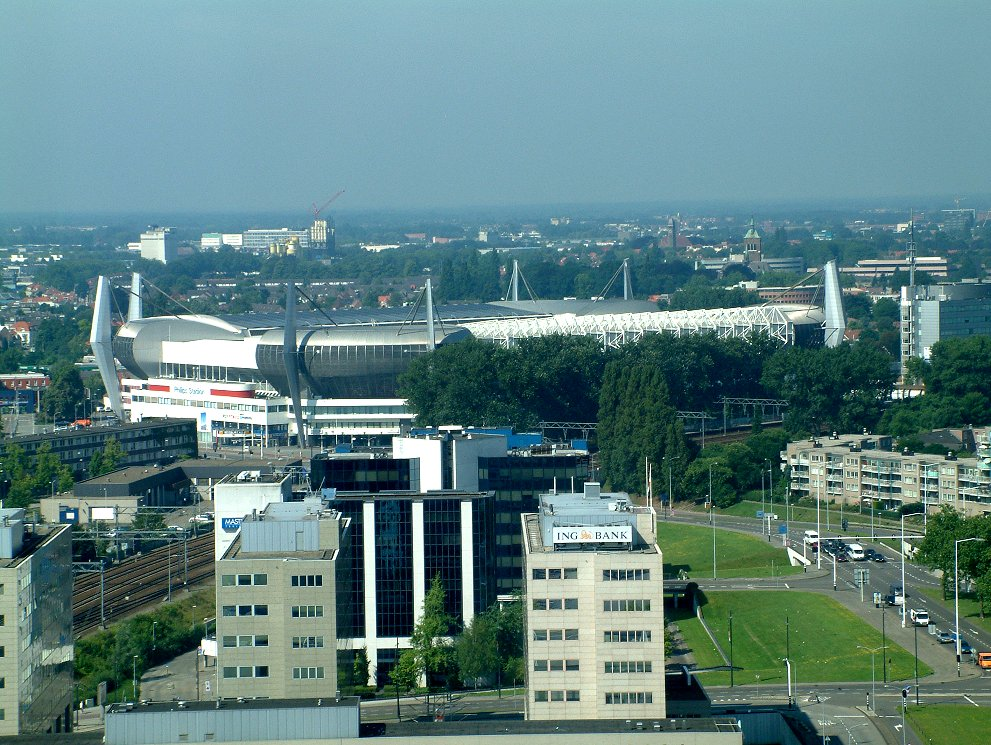
The exterior of the Philips Stadion.

Stadium	Capacity	City	Home team
Blauwe Westmaat	8,500	Spakenburg	SV Spakenburg
Nieuw Zuid	8,200	Katwijk aan Zee	Quick Boys
De Blauwe Kei	7,000	Breda	Baronie
Middelmors	6,100	Rijnsburg	Rijnsburgse Boys
De Vlotter	6,000	Heemskerk	ADO '20
Rode Westmaat	6,000	Spakenburg	IJsselmeervogels
De Krom	6,000	Katwijk	VV Katwijk
De Ebbenhorst	5,350	Nijkerk	Sparta Nijkerk
Dijkpolder	5,000	Maassluis	Excelsior Maassluis
De Bosk	5,000	Harkema	Harkemase Boys
Zuid	4,700	Groesbeek	De Treffers
De Boshoek	4,500	Hardenberg	HHC
Groot Scholtenhagen	4,500	Haaksbergen	HSC '21
Panhuis	4,500	Veenendaal	DOVO
De Koerbelt	4,150	Rijssen	Excelsior '31
Ter Specke	4,000	Lisse	FC Lisse

== See also ==
- List of football clubs in the Netherlands
- List of European stadiums by capacity
- List of association football stadiums by capacity
- List of association football stadiums by country
- List of sports venues by capacity
- Lists of stadiums
- Football in the Netherlands
- List of indoor arenas in the Netherlands
