= AFAS Stadion =

Stadium in Alkmaar, the Netherlands

- Victorie Stadion
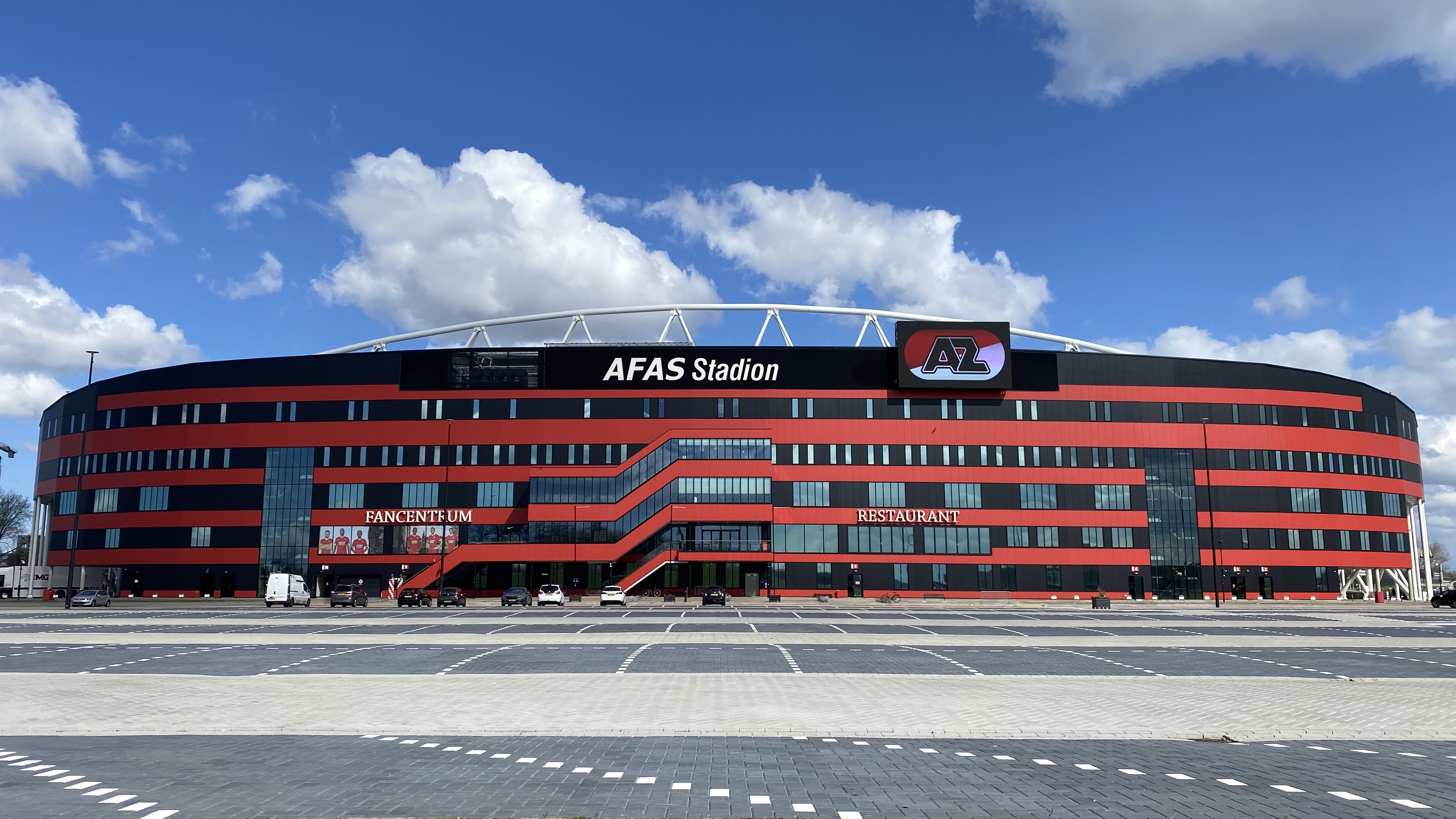
- Interactive map of AFAS Stadion
- Full name: AFAS Stadion
- Former names: DSB Stadion (2006–2009); AZ Stadion (2009–2010, still used in UEFA games)
- Location: Alkmaar, Netherlands
- Coordinates: 52°36′46″N 4°44′32″E
- Capacity: 19,478

Construction
- Opened: 4 August 2006
- Renovated: 2021
- Cost: €38 million

Tenant
- AZ Alkmaar

AFAS Stadion is a stadium in Alkmaar, Netherlands. It is used for football matches and is the home stadium of AZ Alkmaar. AZ's women's team also plays select matches in the stadium. The stadium is able to hold 19,478 people and bears the name of a Dutch software company. Due to UEFA's sponsorship regulations, the stadium is named AZ Stadion in European matches.

== History ==
The stadium officially opened on 4 August 2006 with a friendly against Arsenal. AZ lost 3–0, with Gilberto Silva scoring the stadium's first ever goal. AZ won the first Eredivisie game in its new home, 8–1 over NAC Breda, with German midfielder Simon Cziommer scoring a hat-trick.

AFAS Stadion replaced the club's former ground, Alkmaarderhout. The main stand is called Victorie Tribune, the stand with the fanatic supporters is called Van der Ben Tribune (Ben-Side), the stand behind the opposite goal is called the Alkmaarderhouttribune, in honour of the former stadium, and the stand opposite to the main stand is called Molenaar Tribune after the founders of AZ. Some supporters call the stadium Victorie Stadion, alluding to the victory over Spain in the Siege of Alkmaar in 1573 during the Eighty Years' War.

To further grow the club's budget, the AZ board decided to increase the stadium's capacity to 30,000 seats. This would be achieved by adding a second tier to three of the four stands, leaving the Victorie Tribune untouched. Construction was planned for the second half of 2010, but was delayed indefinitely after the club's main sponsor and one of the main financial contributors to the project, DSB Bank went bankrupt shortly before work started.

On 10 August 2019, the roof of the stadium partially collapsed. No people were injured during the incident. As a result, AZ spent the rest of the year playing home matches at the Cars Jeans Stadion in The Hague.

=== Renovation ===
During the 2020–2021 season, the stadium was renovated. A new roof has been put into place with a greater surface and the capacity was increased to hold around 19,500 fans.

== See also ==
- List of football stadiums in the Netherlands
- Lists of stadiums
